= 2007–08 Chamois Niortais F.C. season =

Chamois Niortais
2007–08 season
- President: Jacques Prévost
- Head coach: Jacky Bonnevay (until January 2008); Samuel Michel (from January 2008)
- Ligue 2: 18th (relegated)
- Coupe de France: Round of 32
- Coupe de la Ligue: Round of 16
- Top goalscorer: League: Benoît Leroy (7); All: Jean-François Rivière (14)
- Highest home attendance: 9,329 (v. Nantes, 29 October 2007)
- Lowest home attendance: 1,321 (v. Châteauroux, 14 December 2007)
- Average home league attendance: 4,962

The 2007–08 season was Chamois Niortais' second consecutive season in Ligue 2 after their 16th-place finish in the previous campaign. With the team struggling in the league, manager Jacky Bonnevay was sacked in January 2008 and replaced by Samuel Michel. However, the new coach could not prevent Niort's relegation to the Championnat National; the team was relegated after losing their final match of the season to a goal in the fourth minute of injury time from Boulogne defender Damien Perrinelle.

A total of 27 different players were used by Niort during the 2007–08, with the trio of Stéphane Morisot, Romain Ferrier and Jacques-Désiré Périatambée each making more than 40 appearances. Benoît Leroy was the top league scorer with 7 goals, while Jean-François Rivière was the highest goalscorer overall, netting a total of 14 in all competitions. Niort fared better in cup competitions than in the league, reaching the last 32 of the Coupe de France and the last 16 of the Coupe de la Ligue for the first time in seven seasons.

== Appearances and goals ==
No.	Pos	Nat	Player	Total		Ligue 2		Coupe de France		Coupe de la Ligue	
No.	Pos	Nat	Player	Apps	Goals	Apps	Goals	Apps	Goals	Apps	Goals
1	GK	(France) FRA	Kévin Aubeneau	1	0	1	0	0	0	0	0
2	DF	(France) FRA	Arnaud Lebrun	37	0	29+1	0	3	0	4	0
3	DF	(France) FRA	Romain Ferrier	40	0	34	0	2	0	3+1	0
4	DF	(France) FRA	Stéphane Morisot	41	3	33+3	2	2+1	1	1+1	0
5	DF	(France) FRA	Damien Da Silva	18	0	13+1	0	3+1	0	0	0
6	MF	(Republic of the Congo) CGO	Denis Tsoumou	39	0	26+5	0	4	0	3+1	0
7	FW	(France) FRA	Hervé Bugnet	12	1	5+6	1	1	0	0	0
8	MF	(Mauritius) MRI	Jacques-Désiré Périatambée	42	1	30+5	1	3	0	3+1	0
9	FW	(France) FRA	Laurent Gagnier	20	3	10+7	3	0	0	3	0
10	FW	(France) FRA	Jean-François Rivière	30	14	20+2	6	4	3	4	5
11	FW	(France) FRA	Romain Jacuzzi	28	7	11+12	4	2	2	1+2	1
12	DF	(France) FRA	Yannick Fischer	34	0	27+1	0	3	0	2+1	0
13	DF	(France) FRA	Jordan Chort	0	0	0	0	0	0	0	0
14	MF	(Argentina) ARG	Matías Pérez García	13	2	10+3	2	0	0	0	0
15	MF	(France) FRA	Vincent Durand	0	0	0	0	0	0	0	0
16	GK	(France) FRA	David Klein	17	0	12	0	4	0	1	0
17	MF	(Burkina Faso) BFA	Abdoul-Aziz Nikiema	0	0	0	0	0	0	0	0
18	DF	(Madagascar) MAD	Marco Randrianantoanina	14	0	4+5	0	1	0	3+1	0
19	MF	(France) FRA	Ronan Biger	34	0	25+5	0	1+2	0	0+1	0
20	DF	(France) FRA	Romain Vincelot	7	0	5+1	0	1	0	0	0
21	DF	(France) FRA	Malik Couturier	36	2	28+1	1	2+1	1	4	0
22	DF	(Mali) MLI	Djibril Konaté	29	2	12+12	2	1+1	0	3	0
23	MF	(France) FRA	Pierre Jamin	10	0	3+5	0	0+1	0	0+1	0
24	FW	(France) FRA	Arnaud Gonzalez	26	5	19+3	4	3	1	0+1	0
26	DF	(France) FRA	Johann Chapuis	38	5	18+12	4	3+1	1	4	0
29	FW	(France) FRA	Benoît Leroy	29	7	16+8	7	1+1	0	2+1	0
30	GK	(France) FRA	Simon Pontdemé	29	0	25+1	0	0	0	3	0
	MF	(France) FRA	Johan Gastien	1	0	0+1	0	0	0	0	0
	FW	(France) FRA	Simon Hébras	2	0	2	0	0	0	0	0
	GK	(France) FRA	François Hiron	0	0	0	0	0	0	0	0
	FW	(France) FRA	Maxime Ras	1	0	0+1	0	0	0	0	0

== Ligue 2 ==
=== League table ===
Pos	Team	Pld	W	D	L	GF	GA	GD	Pts	Promotion or Relegation
16	Boulogne	38	12	7	19	37	54	−17	43	
17	Dijon	38	9	15	14	32	51	−19	42	
18	Niort (R)	38	11	8	19	38	48	−10	41	Relegation to Championnat National
19	Libourne-Saint-Seurin (R)	38	7	11	20	41	62	−21	32	Relegation to Championnat National
20	Gueugnon (R)	38	5	12	21	39	59	−20	27	Relegation to Championnat National

Source: Ligue 2
(R) Relegated

=== Matches ===
27 July 2007 1	Chamois Niortais	2–1	Boulogne	Stade René Gaillard, Niort
20:00	Leroy 3'; Rivière 60'		Thil 45'	Attendance: 4,314; Referee: Julian Grelot

3 August 2007 2	Guingamp	0–0	Chamois Niortais	Stade du Roudourou, Guingamp
20:00				Attendance: 7,708; Referee: Gérald Gregoire

10 August 2007 3	Chamois Niortais	0–1	Sedan	Stade René Gaillard, Niort
20:00			Bonnet 33'	Attendance: 5,230; Referee: Lionel Jaffredo

17 August 2007 4	Reims	3–1	Chamois Niortais	Stade Auguste Delaune, Reims
20:00	Kermorgant 9'; Fauré 70' (pen.), 86'		Chapuis 76' (pen.)	Attendance: 6,904; Referee: Stéphane Djouzi

24 August 2007 5	Chamois Niortais	1–0	Montpellier	Stade René Gaillard, Niort
20:00	Gonzalez 12'			Attendance: 4,436; Referee: Didier Falcone

31 August 2007 6	Amiens	0–2	Chamois Niortais	Stade de la Licorne, Amiens
20:00			Jacuzzi 12', 25'	Attendance: 8,164; Referee: Damien Ledentu

14 September 2007 7	Chamois Niortais	0–1	Angers	Stade René Gaillard, Niort
20:00			Do Marcolino 53'	Attendance: 4,624; Referee: Gaël Lecellier

21 September 2007 8	Châteauroux	1–0	Chamois Niortais	Stade Gaston Petit, Châteauroux
20:00	Bedimo 72' (pen.)		Fischer (red card) 89'	Attendance: 5,492; Referee: Cédric Cotrel

28 September 2007 9	Chamois Niortais	1–3	Bastia	Stade René Gaillard, Niort
20:00	Jacuzzi 11'		Barthélémy 22'; Méniri 32'; André 90'	Attendance: 6,497; Referee: Olivier Thual

2 October 2007 10	Le Havre	1–1	Chamois Niortais	Stade Jules Deschaseaux, Le Havre
20:00	Hoarau 81'		Rivière 52'	Attendance: 9,251; Referee: Sandryk Biton

5 October 2007 11	Chamois Niortais	0–1	Brest	Stade René Gaillard, Niort
20:00			Socrier 47'	Attendance: 3,553; Referee: Dominique Fraise

19 October 2007 12	Libourne	0–2	Chamois Niortais	Stade Jean-Antoine Moueix, Libourne
20:00			Périatambée 21'; Leroy 77'	Attendance: 1,771; Referee: Wilfried Bien

29 October 2007 13	Chamois Niortais	0–1	Nantes	Stade René Gaillard, Niort
20:30			de Freitas 73'; Capoue (yellow card) 90' (red card)	Attendance: 9,329; Referee: Jérôme Auroux

4 November 2007 14	Clermont Foot	1–0	Chamois Niortais	Stade Gabriel Montpied, Clermont-Ferrand
18:00	Darchy 89'			Attendance: 4,950; Referee: Pascal Viléo

7 November 2007 15	Chamois Niortais	2–1	Grenoble	Stade René Gaillard, Niort
20:30	Rivière 3'; Morisot 89'		Akrour 40'	Attendance: 6,197; Referee: Gérald Gregoire

10 November 2007 16	Troyes	1–1	Chamois Niortais	Stade de l'Aube, Troyes
20:30	Faye 82'		Chapuis 86'	Attendance: 7,403; Referee: Wilfried Bien

30 November 2007 17	Chamois Niortais	2–2	Gueugnon	Stade René Gaillard, Niort
20:00	Rivière 15' (pen.), 29' (pen.)		Fouret 2'; Niflore 39'	Attendance: 4,007; Referee: Nicolas Rainville

7 December 2007 18	Dijon	1–3	Chamois Niortais	Stade Gaston Gérard, Dijon
20:00	Mangione 44'		Lotiès 18' (o.g.); Rivière 28'; Jacuzzi 90'	Attendance: 4,126; Referee: Julian Grelot

21 December 2007 19	Ajaccio	2–1	Chamois Niortais	Stade François Coty, Ajaccio
20:00	Lucas 70'; Rocchi 75'		Gonzalez 44'	Attendance: 1,771; Referee: Sandryk Biton

11 January 2008 20	Chamois Niortais	1–3	Guingamp	Stade René Gaillard, Niort
20:00	Chapuis 82' (pen.)		Soumah 32'; Savinaud 61' (pen.); Suarez 64'	Attendance: 3,303; Referee: Damien Ledentu

18 January 2008 21	Sedan	1–0	Chamois Niortais	Stade Louis Dugauguez, Sedan
20:00	Abdoun 48'			Attendance: 7,214; Referee: Jérôme Aurou

25 January 2008 22	Chamois Niortais	0–1	Reims	Stade René Gaillard, Niort
20:00			Fauré 45'; Féret (red card) 87'	Attendance: 3,491; Referee: Alexandre Castro

8 February 2008 23	Montpellier	1–0	Chamois Niortais	Stade de la Mosson, Montpellier
20:00	Camara 90'			Attendance: 5,919; Referee: Gaël Lecellier

15 February 2008 24	Chamois Niortais	1–3	Amiens	Stade René Gaillard, Niort
20:00	Leroy 7'		Buengo 14'; Konaté 70' (o.g.); Mulumbu 90'	Attendance: 3,374; Referee: Dominique Fraise

22 February 2008 25	Angers	1–1	Chamois Niortais	Stade Jean Bouin, Angers
20:00	Leray 90'		Pérez García 90' (pen.)	Attendance: 5,995; Referee: Cédric Cotrel

29 February 2008 26	Chamois Niortais	2–1	Châteauroux	Stade René Gaillard, Niort
20:00	Leroy 68', 80'		Cissé 72'; Bedimo (yellow card) 41' (red card)	Attendance: 3,574; Referee: Clément Turpin

7 March 2008 27	Bastia	2–2	Chamois Niortais	Stade Armand Cesari, Bastia
20:00	André 25'; Pentecôte 52'		Morisot 60'; Konaté 66'	Attendance: 2,185; Referee: Lionel Jaffredo

14 March 2008 28	Chamois Niortais	0–3	Le Havre	Stade René Gaillard, Niort
20:30			Alla 11'; Hoarau 24', 55'	Attendance: 6,931; Referee: Antony Gautier

21 March 2008 29	Brest	4–2	Chamois Niortais	Stade Francis-Le Blé, Brest
20:00	Poyet 3'; Ayité 37', 45' de Carvalho 88'		Gagnier 5', 47'	Attendance: 5,981; Referee: Stéphane Djouzi

28 March 2008 30	Chamois Niortais	2–1	Libourne	Stade René Gaillard, Niort
20:00	Leroy 13'; Gagnier 50'		Keserü 89' (pen.)	Attendance: 8,795; Referee: Ruddy Buquet

4 April 2008 31	Nantes	1–1	Chamois Niortais	Stade de la Beaujoire, Nantes
20:00	Guillon 10'		Konaté 14'; Périatambée (yellow card) 76' (red card)	Attendance: 18,567; Referee: Cédric Cotrel

11 April 2008 32	Chamois Niortais	1–0	Clermont Foot	Stade René Gaillard, Niort
20:00	Bugnet 83'			Attendance: 3,722; Referee: Sandryk Biton

15 April 2008 33	Grenoble	3–1	Chamois Niortais	Stade des Alpes, Grenoble
20:00	Feghouli 45'; Akrour 64'; Glombard 82'		Chapuis 89'; Tsoumou (red card) 67'	Attendance: 14,357; Referee: Clément Turpin

18 April 2008 34	Chamois Niortais	0–0	Troyes	Stade René Gaillard, Niort
20:00				Attendance: 6,925; Referee: Thierry Auriac

25 April 2008 35	Gueugnon	1–0	Chamois Niortais	Stade Jean Laville, Gueugnon
20:00	Louhkiar 11'			Attendance: 2,359; Referee: Gérald Gregoire

2 May 2008 36	Chamois Niortais	3–0	Dijon	Stade René Gaillard, Niort
20:00	Leroy 33'; Couturier 75'; Gonzalez 80'; Klein (red card) 44'			Attendance: 5,863; Referee: Alexandre Castro

12 May 2008 37	Chamois Niortais	2–0	Ajaccio	Stade René Gaillard, Niort
20:30	Gonzalez 8'; Pérez García 48'			Attendance: 7,646; Referee: Julien Grelot

16 May 2008 38	Boulogne	1–0	Chamois Niortais	Stade de la Libération, Boulogne
20:45	Perrinelle 90'		Tsoumou (yellow card) 87' (red card)	Attendance: 7,639; Referee: Bruno Ruffray

== Coupe de France ==
24 November 2007 Seventh round	Périgny	0–7	Chamois Niortais	Stade Municipal, Périgny
20:00			Chapuis 9'; Gonzalez 16'; Rivière 30', 61'; Morisot 43'; Jacuzzi 51'; Couturier 90' (pen.)	Attendance: 1,200; Referee: Noëlle Robin

14 December 2007 Eighth round	Chamois Niortais	1–0	Châteauroux	Stade René Gaillard, Niort
19:00	Jacuzzi 23'			Attendance: 1,231; Referee: Pascal Viléo

4 January 2008 Round of 64	Lens	0–1	Chamois Niortais	Stade Félix Bollaert, Lens
20:30			Rivière 30'	Attendance: 13,000; Referee: Stéphane Bré

2 February 2008 Round of 32	Arles-Avignon	0–0 (a.e.t.) (9–8 p)	Chamois Niortais	Parc des Sports, Avignon
16:00				Attendance: 2,500; Referee: Philippe Malige

== Coupe de la Ligue ==
14 August 2007 First round	Tours	1–2	Chamois Niortais	Stade de la Vallée du Cher, Tours
20:00	Koscielny 29'		Rivière 20', 90'	Attendance: 2,479; Referee: Clément Turpin

28 August 2007 Second round	Chamois Niortais	1–0	Grenoble	Stade René Gaillard, Niort
20:00	Jacuzzi 84'			Attendance: 3,529; Referee: Pascal Viléo

25 September 2007 Round of 32	Chamois Niortais	3–2 (a.e.t.)	Le Havre	Stade René Gaillard, Niort
20:00	Rivière 30', 66', 102'		Mezague 21'; Nikezić 81'	Attendance: 3,551; Referee: Jean-Charles Cailleux

1 November 2007 Round of 16	Chamois Niortais	0–3	Le Mans	Stade René Gaillard, Niort
20:45			de Melo 43'; Gervinho 65'; Le Tallec 87'; Louvion (yellow card) 54' (red card)	Attendance: 4,005; Referee: Bruno Ruffray
