= 2008–09 Chamois Niortais F.C. season =

Chamois Niortais
2008–09 season
- President: Jacques Prévost
- Head coach: Denis Troch
- Championnat National: 17th (relegated)
- Coupe de France: Round of 64
- Coupe de la Ligue: First round
- Top goalscorer: League: Romain Jacuzzi (9); All: Romain Jacuzzi (11)
- Highest home attendance: 5,000 (v. Calais, 22 May 2009)
- Lowest home attendance: 1,386 (v. Boulogne, 3 January 2009)

The 2008–09 season was the first season that Chamois Niortais returned to the Championnat National following their relegation from Ligue 2 at the end of the previous campaign. Denis Troch was hired as the new head coach, replacing Samuel Michel. Niort won only 9 of their 38 league matches and their total of 41 points saw the team finish 17th in the Championnat National, which meant relegation to the Championnat de France amateur for the first time in the club's history in the 2008–09 season.

== Appearances and goals ==
Striker Romain Jacuzzi made the most league appearances for Niort during the 2008–09 season, missing only two matches. He was also the club's top goalscorer with 11 in all competitions. Midfielders Ronan Biger and Matías Pérez García, defenders Yannick Fischer and Mamadou Camara and forward Arnaud Gonzalez were also among the players to make over 30 first-team appearances.

No.	Pos	Nat	Player	Total		Championnat National		Coupe de France		Coupe de la Ligue	
No.	Pos	Nat	Player	Apps	Goals	Apps	Goals	Apps	Goals	Apps	Goals
1	GK	(France) FRA	Kévin Aubeneau	19	0	14	0	5	0	0	0
4	DF	(France) FRA	Robin Desserne	19	1	13+1	1	4	0	1	0
5	DF	(France) FRA	Damien Da Silva	26	1	21+1	1	3	0	1	0
6	MF	(Republic of the Congo) CGO	Denis Tsoumou	22	0	19+1	0	2	0	0	0
7	MF	(France) FRA	Pierre Jamin	10	0	1+7	0	1	0	0+1	0
8	MF	(France) FRA	Johan Gastien	25	1	15+5	0	3+1	1	0+1	0
9	FW	(France) FRA	Arnaud Gonzalez	35	2	31+1	2	2	0	1	0
10	MF	(France) FRA	Fabien Lavoyer	28	1	19+6	1	2	0	1	0
11	FW	(France) FRA	Romain Jacuzzi	42	11	28+8	9	5	2	1	0
12	DF	(France) FRA	Yannick Fischer	33	1	30	1	3	0	0	0
13	DF	(France) FRA	Quentin Bernard	11	0	8	0	2+1	0	0	0
14	MF	(Argentina) ARG	Matías Pérez García	37	4	28+3	3	5	1	1	0
15	FW	(France) FRA	Luigi Glombard	30	5	25+1	5	3	0	1	0
17	MF	(France) FRA	Nicolas Marti	2	0	0	0	0+2	0	0	0
18	MF	(France) FRA	Nicolas De Géa	25	2	10+10	2	2+2	0	0+1	0
19	MF	(France) FRA	Ronan Biger	39	5	30+5	3	4	2	0	0
20	MF	(France) FRA	Yvan Kibundu	25	1	11+12	0	0+1	0	1	1
21	DF	(France) FRA	Vincent Bolot	9	0	5+4	0	0	0	0	0
23	FW	(France) FRA	Maxime Ras	15	2	2+11	1	0+2	1	0	0
25	FW	(Mali) MLI	Cheick Oumar Dabo	29	2	16+12	2	0+1	0	0	0
26	DF	(France) FRA	Mamadou Camara	36	0	27+3	0	5	0	1	0
27	DF	(Cape Verde) CPV	Jimmy Modeste	24	0	19+2	0	2	0	1	0
29	FW	(France) FRA	Simon Hébras	6	0	0+5	0	0+1	0	0	0
30	GK	(France) FRA	Simon Pontdemé	25	0	24	0	0	0	1	0
33	DF	(France) FRA	Jonathan Rivierez	25	0	23	0	2	0	0	0
	FW	(France) FRA	Samuel Delahaye	1	0	0+1	0	0	0	0	0

== Championnat National ==
=== League table ===
Pos	Team	Pld	W	D	L	GF	GA	GD	Pts	Promotion or Relegation
15	Rodez	38	13	7	18	40	39	+1	46	
16	Louhans-Cuiseaux (Note: Louhans-Cuiseaux have been deducted 3 points.)	38	12	13	13	38	48	−10	46	Relegation to 2009-10 Championnat de France amateur (Note: All clubs that secured Championnat National status for next season were subject to approval by the DNCG before becoming eligible to participate. Following the DNCG's annual report on clubs, on 25 June, it was announced that six clubs had been relegated from the National to lower divisions. AS Beauvais, SO Cassis Carnoux, CS Louhans-Cuiseaux, and FC Libourne Saint-Seurin were relegated to the Championnat de France Amateurs. Besançon RC, US Luzenac, and FC Rouen, who were all recently promoted, were relegated to Championnat de France Amateurs 2, while FC Sète and Calais RUFC were relegated to the Division d'Honneur. All clubs relegated were allowed to appeal the decision. Following an appeal from the aforementioned clubs, FC Rouen, AS Beauvais, and US Luzenac had their appeals overturned meaning they will remain in the Championnat National. Some clubs were, however, unsuccessful. FC Sète's appeal was upheld relegating them to the Division d'Honneur. Stade Plabennecois will replace them in the Championnat National. FC Libourne Saint-Seurin, Besançon RC, and Calais RUFC appeals were also rejected by the DNCG, however, all three clubs have decided to take their case to the CNOSF, the National Sporting Committee of France which governs sport in France. Both Calais and Besançon's rulings were determined on 23 July. The CNOSF determined that Besançon should be relegated to the CFA and not CFA 2, while Calais should respect and oblige the DNCG's ruling relegated them to CFA 2. Libourne's ruling was determined on 27 July, when the CNOSF informed the club that they should honour the DNCG's ruling and suffer relegation to the CFA. Libourne's chairman Bernard Layda responded by announcing the club will file for bankruptcy, restructure the club, and oblige the ruling. Besançon and Libourne were replaced by ES Fréjus and AS Moulins. Both CS Louhans-Cuiseaux and SO Cassis Carnoux had their appeals heard by the DNCG on 9 July. On 10 July, the DNGC ruled that both Louhans-Cuiseaux and Cassis-Carnoux rulings had been overturned meaning they will play in the Championnat National this season.)
17	Niort (R)	38	9	14	15	31	37	−6	41	Relegation to 2009-10 Championnat de France amateur
18	Calais (D, R)	38	10	10	18	34	50	−16	40	Relegation to DSE
19	Entente SSG (R)	38	9	9	20	29	48	−19	36	Relegation to 2009-10 Championnat de France amateur

Rules for classification: 1) points; 2) goal difference; 3) number of goals scored.
(D) Disqualified; (R) Relegated

=== Matches ===
1 August 2008 1	Chamois Niortais	0–0	Pacy-sur-Eure	Stade René Gaillard, Niort
20:00				Attendance: 2,500; Referee: Yohann Rouinsard

9 August 2008 2	Rodez	2–1	Chamois Niortais	Stade Paul Lignon, Rodez
20:00	Choplin 14'; Belaud 47'		De Géa 9'	Attendance: 2,000; Referee: Stéphane Djouzi

15 August 2008 3	Chamois Niortais	0–0	Louhans-Cuiseaux	Stade René Gaillard, Niort
20:00				Attendance: 2,415; Referee: Stéphane Jochem

23 August 2008 4	Évian TG	2–0	Chamois Niortais	Parc des Sports, Annecy
18:00	Cavaglia 22'; Bérigaud 84'; Dupraz (red card) 88'		Gastien (yellow card) 90' (red card)	Attendance: 1,100; Referee: Olivier Lamarre

29 August 2008 5	Chamois Niortais	0–0	Laval	Stade René Gaillard, Niort
20:00				Attendance: 2,842; Referee: Sandryk Biton

12 September 2008 6	Chamois Niortais	3–3	Cherbourg	Stade René Gaillard, Niort
20:00	Jacuzzi 5'; Glombard 14', 68'		Inkango 11', 80'; Miranda 90'	Attendance: 2,557; Referee: Sébastien Butault

19 September 2008 7	Cannes	0–0	Chamois Niortais	Stade Pierre de Coubertin, Cannes
20:00				Attendance: 1,123; Referee: Ludovic Rémy

26 September 2008 8	Chamois Niortais	0–2	Istres	Stade René Gaillard, Niort
20:00	Pérez García (red card) 84'		Feindouno 61'; Arbaud 90'; Coulibaly (red card) 84'	Attendance: 2,000; Referee: Cédric Cortel

30 September 2008 9	Bayonne	1–0	Chamois Niortais	Stade Didier Deschamps, Bayonne
20:00	Choplin 39'			Attendance: 931; Referee: Jérôme Aurou

4 October 2008 10	Beauvais	2–1	Chamois Niortais	Stade Pierre Brisson, Beauvais
20:00	Ramdani 22'; Ouédraogo 30'		Jacuzzi 90'	Attendance: 1,400; Referee: Abby Toussaint

10 October 2008 11	Chamois Niortais	0–1	Paris FC	Stade René Gaillard, Niort
20:00	Tsoumou (yellow card) 75' (red card)		Yenga 63'	Attendance: 2,000; Referee: Franck Schneider

14 October 2008 12	Sète	0–0	Chamois Niortais	Stade Louis Michel, Sète
20:00				Attendance: 1,000; Referee: Pascal Vileo

25 October 2008 13	Chamois Niortais	2–1	Arles-Avignon	Stade René Gaillard, Niort
20:00	Desserne 20'; Jacuzzi 78'		Baléguhé 27'	Attendance: 2,511; Referee: Alban Hung

7 November 2008 14	Gueugnon	0–0	Chamois Niortais	Stade Jean Laville, Gueugnon
20:00				Attendance: 1,901; Referee: Stéphane Jochem

14 November 2008 15	Chamois Niortais	1–0	Libourne	Stade René Gaillard, Niort
20:00	Jacuzzi 90'			Attendance: 3,000; Referee: Johan Hamel

28 November 2008 16	Chamois Niortais	1–1	Créteil	Stade René Gaillard, Niort
20:00	Fischer 12'		Bouabdellah 8'	Attendance: 1,800; Referee: Julien Schmitt

6 December 2008 17	Entente SSG	2–2	Chamois Niortais	Stade Michel Hidalgo, Sannois
17:00	Keita 18'; Boutadjine 90'		Jacuzzi 41'; Biger 75'	Attendance: 807; Referee: Wilifried Bien

19 December 2008 18	Chamois Niortais	1–2	Cassis Carnoux	Stade René Gaillard, Niort
20:00	Biger 51'		De La Loma 50'; Cazarelly 89'	Attendance: 2,495; Referee: Nicolas Rainville

16 January 2009 19	Chamois Niortais	1–0	Rodez	Stade René Gaillard, Niort
20:00	Pérez García 56'			Attendance: 2,435; Referee: Sébastien Desiage

31 January 2009 20	Louhans-Cuiseaux	1–0	Chamois Niortais	Stade du Bram, Louhans
18:00	Prévitali 87' (red card) 90'		Camara (yellow card) 54' (red card)	Attendance: 1,200; Referee: Johan Hamel

6 February 2009 21	Chamois Niortais	3–0	Évian TG	Stade René Gaillard, Niort
20:00	Jacuzzi 17', 51'; De Géa 72'			Attendance: 1,800; Referee: Stéphane Jochem

13 February 2009 22	Laval	1–0	Chamois Niortais	Stade Francis Le Basser, Laval
20:00	Nouar 25'			Attendance: 5,080; Referee: Jérôme Auroux

17 February 2009 23	Calais	2–1	Chamois Niortais	Stade de l'Épopée, Calais
20:00	Hoguet 40'; Millien 60'		Pérez García 75'; Camara (red card) 41'; Gastien (yellow card) 90' (red card)	Attendance: 2,839; Referee: Dominique Julien

21 February 2009 24	Chamois Niortais	1–0	Bayonne	Stade René Gaillard, Niort
20:00	Da Silva 53'			Attendance: 2,494; Referee: William Lavis

28 February 2009 25	Cherbourg	1–2	Chamois Niortais	Stade Maurice Postaire, Cherbourg-en-Cotentin
20:00	Durand 70'		Glombard 29'; Biger 49'	Attendance: 1,302; Referee: Sébastien Butault

6 March 2009 26	Chamois Niortais	0–0	Cannes	Stade René Gaillard, Niort
20:00				Attendance: 2,821; Referee: Philippe Gasquet

13 March 2009 27	Istres	1–0	Chamois Niortais	Stade Parsemain, Istres
20:00	Doumbia 3'			Attendance: 1,996; Referee: Yohann Rouinsard

20 March 2009 28	Chamois Niortais	1–1	Beauvais	Stade René Gaillard, Niort
20:00	Lavoyer 13'		Milambo-Mutamba 89'	Attendance: 2,617; Referee: Christian Guillard

27 March 2009 29	Paris FC	1–1	Chamois Niortais	Stade Charléty, Paris
20:00	Sarr 66'		Pérez García 54'	Attendance: 300; Referee: Ludovic Rémy

3 April 2009 30	Chamois Niortais	3–0	Sète	Stade René Gaillard, Niort
20:00	Jacuzzi 34'; Dabo 59'; Gonzalez 73'			Attendance: 2,661; Referee: Jérôme Auroux

10 April 2009 31	Arles-Avignon	4–2	Chamois Niortais	Parc des Sports, Avignon
20:00	Henaini 35'; Psaume 49', 51'; Jamaï 63'		Dabo 40'; Ras 80'	Attendance: 584; Referee: Abdelali Chaoui

17 April 2009 32	Chamois Niortais	0–2	Gueugnon	Stade René Gaillard, Niort
20:00			Akouzar 12'; Pollet 44'	Attendance: 2,500; Referee: Yohann Rouinsard

24 April 2009 33	Libourne	2–0	Chamois Niortais	Stade Jean-Antoine Moueix, Libourne
20:00	Martin 40'; Djaballah 90'			Attendance: 3,205; Referee: Sébastien Butault

1 May 2009 34	Créteil	0–0	Chamois Niortais	Stade Dominique Duvauchelle, Créteil
20:00				Attendance: 500; Referee: Cédric Cortel

8 May 2009 35	Chamois Niortais	1–0	Entente SSG	Stade René Gaillard, Niort
20:00	Glombard 67'		Maïa (yellow card) 60' (red card)	Attendance: 2,500; Referee: Dominique Julien

16 May 2009 36	Cassis Carnoux	0–2	Chamois Niortais	Stade Marcel Cerdan, Carnoux-en-Provence
20:00			Glombard 3'; Gonzalez 53'	Attendance: 100; Referee: Julien Schmitt

22 May 2009 37	Chamois Niortais	1–2	Calais	Stade René Gaillard, Niort
20:00	Jacuzzi 45'		Roye 23'; Danset 53'	Attendance: 5,000; Referee: Eric Werner

29 May 2009 38	Pacy-sur-Eure	0–0	Chamois Niortais	Stade Pacy-Ménilles, Ménilles
20:00				Attendance: 717; Referee: William Lavis

== Coupe de France ==
Niort joined the 2008–09 Coupe de France in the fifth round, along with the other clubs in the Championnat National. The team's first game in the cup was a 1–0 win against Division d'Honneur side US Chauvigny thanks to an injury time goal from midfielder Johan Gastien. In the sixth round, Niort were drawn away at Championnat de France amateur 2 club ESA Brive. They took a second-half lead through Romain Jacuzzi, but the home side equalised from a penalty kick from striker Oussama Belfoul. Jacuzzi was on target again in the seventh round, scoring Niort's first in a 2–1 win away at Les Herbiers VF before Argentine midfielder Matías Pérez García netted the winning goal three minutes from time.

Niort were handed a fourth consecutive away tie in the eighth round, being drawn to play away at Championnat de France amateur side Quimper on 13 December 2008. Following a goalless draw after extra time, during which defender Damien Da Silva was given a straight red card, Niort progressed 4–1 in a penalty shoot-out in which goalkeeper Kévin Aubeneau saved two spot kicks. In the round of 64, the team was drawn at home to Ligue 2 outfit US Boulogne. Niort scored first through Ronan Biger, but Congolese midfielder Christian Kinkela equalised for the visitors in the 86th minute to take the tie to extra time. Despite having defender Éric Cubilier sent off for a second bookable offence, Boulogne took the lead thanks to a Grégory Thil penalty following a foul by Mamadou Camara.

18 October 2008 Fifth round	Chauvigny	0–1	Chamois Niortais	Stade Gilbert Arnault, Chauvigny
			Gastien	Attendance: 691; Referee: Franck Doucet

1 November 2008 Sixth round	Brive	1–3 (a.e.t.)	Chamois Niortais	Stade André Pestourie, Brive-la-Gaillarde
	Belfoul 73' (pen.); Donneyel (yellow card) 80' (red card)		Jacuzzi 59'; Biger 100'; Ras 110'	Attendance: 200; Referee: Cedric Dos Santos

22 November 2008 Seventh round	Les Herbiers	1–2	Chamois Niortais	Stade Massabielle, Les Herbiers
	Da Cunha 74'		Jacuzzi 51'; Pérez García 87'	Attendance: 2,000; Referee: Fabrice Baussay

13 December 2008 Eighth round	Quimper	0–0 (a.e.t.) (1–4 p)	Chamois Niortais	Stade Penvillers, Quimper
			Da Silva (red card) 117'	Attendance: 894; Referee: Mike Denis

3 January 2009 Round of 64	Chamois Niortais	1–2 (a.e.t.)	Boulogne	Stade René Gaillard, Niort
	Biger 55'		Kinkela 86'; Thil 107' (pen.); Cubilier (yellow card) 92' (red card)	Attendance: 1,386; Referee: Jérôme Auroux

== Coupe de la Ligue ==
As one of the teams relegated from Ligue 2 at the end of the 2007–08 season, Niort were eligible to contest the Coupe de la Ligue and entered the competition in the first round. The team was drawn to play Créteil away at the Stade Dominique Duvauchelle on 19 August 2008. Despite leading at half time through a goal from young midfielder Yvan Kibundu, Niort were defeated 1–2 thanks to late goals from the home side.

19 August 2008 First round	Créteil	2–1	Chamois Niortais	Stade Dominique Duvauchelle, Créteil
	Bouabdellah 75'; Argelier 82'		Kibundu 43'	Attendance: 665; Referee: Olivier Husset
