= 2006–07 Chamois Niortais F.C. season =

Chamois Niortais
2006–07 season
- President: Jacques Prévost
- Head coach: Philippe Hinschberger (until February 2007); Faruk Hadžibegić (from February 2007)
- Ligue 2: 16th
- Coupe de France: Round of 32
- Coupe de la Ligue: First round
- Top goalscorer: League: Benoît Leroy (11); All: Benoît Leroy (15)
- Highest home attendance: 9,053 (v. Brest, 6 April 2007)
- Lowest home attendance: 2,909 (v. Libourne, 15 August 2006)
- Average home league attendance: 4,402

In the 2006–07 season Chamois Niortais played in Ligue 2, the second tier of French football, following their promotion after winning the Championnat National in the previous season. Philippe Hinschberger started the campaign as team manager, but was replaced by Bosnian Faruk Hadžibegić in February 2007. Niort finished the season in 16th position with a record of 10 wins, 14 draws and 14 defeats from their 38 matches. The team reached the last 32 of the Coupe de France, but was knocked out of the Coupe de la Ligue in the first round.

== Appearances and goals ==
No.	Pos	Nat	Player	Total		Ligue 2		Coupe de France		Coupe de la Ligue	
No.	Pos	Nat	Player	Apps	Goals	Apps	Goals	Apps	Goals	Apps	Goals
1	GK	(France) FRA	Christophe Ott	0	0	0	0	0	0	0	0
2	DF	(France) FRA	Arnaud Lebrun	19	0	16	0	3	0	0	0
3	DF	(France) FRA	Romain Ferrier	37	1	30+2	1	4	0	1	0
4	DF	(France) FRA	Stéphane Morisot	22	2	19	2	3	0	0	0
5	MF	(France) FRA	David Bouard	37	1	28+4	1	4	0	1	0
6	MF	(France) FRA	Ludovic Gamboa	0	0	0	0	0	0	0	0
7	FW	(France) FRA	Laurent Gagnier	24	5	17+4	2	2+1	3	0	0
8	MF	(Mauritius) MRI	Jacques-Désiré Périatambée	34	1	29+1	0	3	1	0+1	0
9	FW	(France) FRA	Roland Vieira	11	0	1+8	0	0+1	0	1	0
10	FW	(France) FRA	Jean-François Rivière	38	5	28+6	5	3	0	0+1	0
11	FW	(Nigeria) NGA	James Obiorah	17	2	7+9	2	0	0	1	0
13	DF	(France) FRA	Jordan Chort	2	0	2	0	0	0	0	0
14	MF	(France) FRA	Karim Fradin	30	0	24+3	0	3	0	0	0
15	MF	(France) FRA	Vincent Durand	19	0	5+12	0	1	0	1	0
16	GK	(France) FRA	David Klein	41	0	37	0	3	0	1	0
17	MF	(Burkina Faso) BFA	Abdoul-Aziz Nikiema	9	0	1+6	0	1	0	1	0
19	MF	(France) FRA	Ronan Biger	21	1	10+8	0	1+2	1	0	0
20	DF	(France) FRA	Romain Vincelot	9	0	8+1	0	0	0	0	0
21	DF	(France) FRA	Malik Couturier	37	3	33	2	3	1	1	0
22	DF	(Mali) MLI	Djibril Konaté	28	0	13+13	0	1	0	1	0
23	DF	(France) FRA	Joachim Ichane	1	0	1	0	0	0	0	0
24	FW	(France) FRA	Arnaud Gonzalez	37	8	30+3	6	2+1	2	1	0
25	DF	(France) FRA	Jérôme Cellier	23	2	12+8	1	0+3	1	0	0
26	DF	(France) FRA	Johann Chapuis	37	4	33	3	2+1	1	1	0
27	FW	(Ivory Coast) CIV	Fabrice Seidou	7	0	0+6	0	0+1	0	0	0
28	MF	(France) FRA	Anthony Delavaud	0	0	0	0	0	0	0	0
29	FW	(France) FRA	Benoît Leroy	42	15	29+8	11	4	3	0+1	1
30	GK	(France) FRA	Simon Pontdemé	3	0	1+1	0	1	0	0	0
32	DF	(France) FRA	Damien Da Silva	4	0	3	0	0+1	0	0	0
33	MF	(France) FRA	Frédéric Laurent	7	0	1+6	0	0	0	0	0
	MF	(France) FRA	Pierre Jamin	2	0	0+2	0	0	0	0	0

== Ligue 2 ==
=== League table ===
Pos	Team	Pld	W	D	L	GF	GA	GD	Pts	Promotion or Relegation
14	Brest	38	10	15	13	40	40	0	45	
15	Montpellier	38	11	11	16	41	48	−7	44	
16	Niort	38	10	14	14	36	44	−8	44	
17	Libourne-Saint-Seurin	38	12	8	18	43	52	−9	44	
18	Créteil (R)	38	9	13	16	33	50	−17	40	Relegation to Championnat National

Source: Ligue 2
(R) Relegated

=== Matches ===
28 July 2006 1	Ajaccio	1–1	Chamois Niortais	Stade François Coty, Ajaccio
20:00	Khiter 78'		Gagnier 31'	Attendance: 2,043; Referee: Jean-Charles Cailleux

4 August 2006 2	Chamois Niortais	2–1	Grenoble	Stade René Gaillard, Niort
20:00	Ferrier 31'; Leroy 57'		Pelé 27'	Attendance: 3,599; Referee: Christian Guillard

8 August 2006 3	Gueugnon	0–1	Chamois Niortais	Stade Jean Laville, Gueugnon
20:00			Obiorah 84'	Attendance: 3,224; Referee: Julian Grelot

11 August 2006 4	Chamois Niortais	2–2	Strasbourg	Stade René Gaillard, Niort
20:00	Chapuis 11'; Couturier 22'; Vincelot (yellow card) 89' (red card)		Abdessadki 34'; Ekobo 41'	Attendance: 5,577; Referee: Olivier Lamarre

18 August 2006 5	Istres	1–0	Chamois Niortais	Stade Bernard Bardin, Istres
20:00	Coulibaly 77'			Attendance: 3,139; Referee: Ruddy Buquet

25 August 2006 6	Chamois Niortais	0–0	Reims	Stade René Gaillard, Niort
20:00				Attendance: 3,897; Referee: Jean-Paul Harribey

8 September 2006 7	Libourne	3–1	Chamois Niortais	Stade Jean-Antoine Moueix, Libourne
20:00	Deranja 21', 23'; Kébé 31'; Begeorgi (red card) 49'		Leroy 58'	Attendance: 2,094; Referee: Stéphane Djouzi

15 September 2006 8	Chamois Niortais	2–2	Caen	Stade René Gaillard, Niort
20:00	Gonzalez 59'; Leroy 67'		Hengbart 23'; Sorbon 71'	Attendance: 3,735; Referee: Gérald Gregoire

22 September 2006 9	Bastia	4–1	Chamois Niortais	Stade Armand Cesari, Bastia
20:00	Mendy 19'; André 45'; Cherrad 71'; Gomez 80'		Chapuis 87'	Attendance: 3,189; Referee: Gaël Lecellier

29 September 2006 10	Chamois Niortais	1–1	Metz	Stade René Gaillard, Niort
20:00	Rivière 8'		Obraniak 27'; Béria (yellow card) 90' (red card)	Attendance: 5,411; Referee: Julian Grelot

13 October 2006 11	Dijon	2–1	Chamois Niortais	Stade Gaston Gérard, Dijon
20:00	Bugnet 33'; Vosalho 79'		Leroy 16'	Attendance: 4,313; Referee: Antony Gautier

20 October 2006 12	Chamois Niortais	1–1	Montpellier	Stade René Gaillard, Niort
20:00	Leroy 56'		Cissé 88'	Attendance: 3,582; Referee: Jérôme Auroux

27 October 2006 13	Brest	1–0	Chamois Niortais	Stade Francis-Le Blé, Brest
20:00	Socrier 79'			Attendance: 4,669; Referee: Fredy Fautrel

3 November 2006 14	Amiens	1–0	Chamois Niortais	Stade de la Licorne, Amiens
20:00	Heitzmann 29'			Attendance: 6,520; Referee: Stéphane Lannoy

7 November 2006 15	Chamois Niortais	2–0	Châteauroux	Stade René Gaillard, Niort
20:00	Gonzalez 2'; Obiorah 9'			Attendance: 3,442; Referee: Didier Falcone

10 November 2006 16	Tours	1–0	Chamois Niortais	Stade de la Vallée du Cher, Tours
20:00	Maréval 79'			Attendance: 3,772; Referee: Christian Guillard

17 November 2006 17	Chamois Niortais	0–1	Guingamp	Stade René Gaillard, Niort
20:00			Soumah 46'	Attendance: 5,075; Referee: Philippe Gasquet

1 December 2006 18	Créteil	3–1	Chamois Niortais	Stade Dominique Duvauchelle, Créteil
20:00	El-Omari 36'; Vareilles 76', 88'		Leroy 81'	Attendance: 3,059; Referee: Antony Gautier

8 December 2006 19	Chamois Niortais	0–0	Le Havre	Stade René Gaillard, Niort
20:00				Attendance: 3,101; Referee: Bruno Derrien

22 December 2006 20	Grenoble	4–1	Chamois Niortais	Stade Lesdiguières, Grenoble
20:00	Chapuis 28'; Akrour 64', 90'; Kermorgant 84'		Leroy 58'	Attendance: 5,067; Referee: Fredy Fautrel

12 January 2007 21	Chamois Niortais	1–1	Gueugnon	Stade René Gaillard, Niort
20:00	Leroy 33'		Hoarau 16'	Attendance: 3,446; Referee: Pascal Viléo

26 January 2007 22	Strasbourg	1–0	Chamois Niortais	Stade de la Meinau, Strasbourg
20:00	Bellaïd 56'			Attendance: 10,914; Referee: Stéphane Djouzi

2 February 2007 23	Chamois Niortais	0–0	Istres	Stade René Gaillard, Niort
20:00			Gallon (yellow card) 60' (red card); Doumbia (red card) 63'	Attendance: 3,333; Referee: Fredy Fautrel

9 February 2007 24	Reims	2–3	Chamois Niortais	Stade Auguste Delaune, Reims
20:00	Barbier 62'; Tourenne 65'; Giraudon (yellow card) 90' (red card)		Gagnier 22'; Leroy 45'; Gonzalez 72'	Attendance: 5,580; Referee: Christian Guillard

16 February 2007 25	Chamois Niortais	2–0	Libourne	Stade René Gaillard, Niort
20:00	Bouard 67'; Cellier 84'		Gragnic (red card) 59'	Attendance: 3,979; Referee: Laurent Duhamel

23 February 2007 26	Caen	4–0	Chamois Niortais	Stade Michel d'Ornano, Caen
20:00	Company 20', 49'; Samson 36'; Toudic 85'			Attendance: 14,773; Referee: Olivier Lamarre

2 March 2007 27	Chamois Niortais	0–0	Bastia	Stade René Gaillard, Niort
20:00				Attendance: 4,221; Referee: Gérald Gregoire

9 March 2007 28	Metz	0–0	Chamois Niortais	Stade Saint-Symphorien, Metz
20:00				Attendance: 10,477; Referee: Cédric Cotrel

16 March 2007 29	Chamois Niortais	2–1	Dijon	Stade René Gaillard, Niort
20:00	Gonzalez 38'; Morisot 45'		Vosalho 81'	Attendance: 5,242; Referee: Jean-Charles Cailleux

30 March 2007 30	Montpellier	2–1	Chamois Niortais	Stade de la Mosson, Montpellier
20:00	Lebrun 2' (o.g.); Delaye 57'		Rivière 86'	Attendance: 11,602; Referee: Antony Gautier

6 April 2007 31	Chamois Niortais	1–0	Brest	Stade René Gaillard, Niort
20:00	Morisot 45'			Attendance: 9,053; Referee: Stéphane Djouzi

13 April 2007 32	Chamois Niortais	2–0	Amiens	Stade René Gaillard, Niort
20:00	Gonzalez 19'; Couturier 68'			Attendance: 6,008; Referee: Gaël Lecellier

20 April 2007 33	Châteauroux	0–0	Chamois Niortais	Stade Gaston Petit, Châteauroux
20:00				Attendance: 5,913; Referee: Sandryk Biton

27 April 2007 34	Chamois Niortais	0–0	Tours	Stade René Gaillard, Niort
20:00				Attendance: 4,639; Referee: Ruddy Buquet

4 May 2007 35	Guingamp	1–0	Chamois Niortais	Stade du Roudourou, Guingamp
20:00	Eduardo 75' (pen.)			Attendance: 11,127; Referee: Olivier Lamarre

11 May 2007 36	Chamois Niortais	2–1	Créteil	Stade René Gaillard, Niort
20:00	Rivière 49'; Gonzalez 73'		Pataca 33'	Attendance: 5,636; Referee: Bruno Ruffray

18 May 2007 37	Le Havre	2–2	Chamois Niortais	Stade Jules Deschaseaux, Le Havre
20:00	Lesage 22'; Laurant 61'		Leroy 30'; Rivière 59'	Attendance: 10,062; Referee: Bruno Coué

25 May 2007 38	Chamois Niortais	3–0	Ajaccio	Stade René Gaillard, Niort
20:00	Leroy 66'; Rivière 80'; Chapuis 89'			Attendance: 8,153; Referee: Didier Falcone

== Coupe de France ==
25 November 2006 Seventh round	Fontenay-le-Comte	2–3	Chamois Niortais	Stade Municipal, Fontenay-le-Comte
	Landry 2', 6'		Leroy 33', 55'; Gagnier 63'	Referee: Bartolomeu Varela

16 December 2006 Eighth round	Les Sables-d'Olonne	0–5	Chamois Niortais	Stade de la Rudelière, Les Sables-d'Olonne
			Gagnier 3', 25'; Biger 83'; Gonzalez 85'; Cellier 89'	Referee: Pascal Viléo

6 January 2007 Round of 64	Auxerre	2–2 (a.e.t.) (4–5 p)	Chamois Niortais	Stade Abbe-Deschamps, Auxerre
	Kahlenberg 39'; Pedretti 86'		Gonzalez 67'; Périatambée 72'	Referee: Stéphane Moulin

20 January 2007 Round of 32	Bordeaux	3–3 (a.e.t.) (5–4 p)	Chamois Niortais	Stade Chaban-Delmas, Bordeaux
	Francia 8', 36'; Perea 106'		Couturier 68'; Chapuis 90'; Leroy 97'; Bouard (red card) 10'	Attendance: 10,220; Referee: Bruno Coué

== Coupe de la Ligue ==
15 August 2006 First round	Chamois Niortais	1–2	Libourne	Stade René Gaillard, Niort
20:00	Leroy 90'		Begeorgi 46'; Deranja 85'	Attendance: 2,909; Referee: Philippe Gasquet
