= 1982 in France =

- Decades: 1960s; 1970s; 1980s; 1990s; 2000s
- See also: History of France; Timeline of French history; List of years in France

Events from the year 1982 in France.

== Incumbents ==
- President: François Mitterrand
- Prime Minister: Pierre Mauroy

== Events ==
- 18 January – Swiss activist Chaïm Nissim fires five rockets, obtained from the Red Army Faction through Carlos the Jackal, on the Superphénix nuclear plant, then under construction. Rockets are launched at the incomplete containment building and cause damage, missing the reactor's empty core.
- 2 March – Decentralisation in France: Law of Decentralisation creates the administrative regions of France (régions).
- 14 March – Cantonales Elections held.
- 21 March – Cantonales Elections held.
- 22 April - April 1982 Paris car bombing.
- 4 June – 8th G7 summit begins in Versailles.
- 6 June – 8th G7 summit closes.
- 31 July – Beaune coach crash: 53 persons, 46 of them children, die in a road accident in Beaune in France's worst road accident.
- 9 August – Six people are killed and 22 injured when the Jo Goldenberg restaurant on the Rue des Rosiers in Paris' Jewish quarter is attacked by terrorists.
- 28 August – The "Irish of Vincennes" are arrested by a secret presidential anti-terrorist police unit on suspicion of the Jo Goldenberg attack. They are later exonerated when the evidence against them is found to have been planted.
- 2 October – Launch of the Citroën BX, successor to the Citroën GS.

== Births ==
=== January to March ===
- 1 January – Yves Donguy, rugby union player
- 4 January – Benoît Haaby, soccer player
- 5 January – Benoît Vaugrenard, cyclist
- 10 January – Julien Brellier, soccer player
- 11 January – Loïc Guillon, soccer player
- 11 January – Grégory Lacombe, soccer player
- 12 January – Grégory Lamboley, rugby union player
- 12 January – Paul-Henri Mathieu, tennis player
- 13 January – Philippe Billy, soccer player
- 21 January – Nicolas Mahut, tennis player
- 21 January – Sarah Ourahmoune, boxer
- 28 January – Sébastien Puygrenier, soccer player
- 2 February – Amelie Delagrange, murder victim (died 2004)
- 28 February – Aurélien Capoue, soccer player
- 8 March – Stéphane Biakolo, soccer player
- 17 March – Matthieu Dafreville, judoka
- 17 March – Julien Gorius, soccer player
- 23 March – Christophe Coue, soccer player
- 30 March – Philippe Mexès, soccer player
- 31 March – David Poisson, alpine skier (d. 2017)

=== April to June ===
- 4 April – Rémi Pauriol, cyclist
- 5 April – Alexandre Prémat, motor racing driver
- 25 April – Grégory Bourdy, golfer
- 8 May – Habib Bamogo, soccer player
- 17 May – Tony Parker, basketball player
- 18 May – Yannick Bonheur, pair skater
- 20 May – Lionel Djebi-Zadi, soccer player
- 20 May – Clément Poitrenaud, rugby union player
- 20 May – Donald Reignoux, actor
- 26 May – Mathieu Martinez, Nordic combined skier
- 4 June – Sébastien Portal, cyclist
- 12 June – Sébastien Minard, cyclist
- 17 June – Alexandre Alphonse, soccer player
- 18 June – Fabien Lefèvre, whitewater kayaker
- 24 June – Sylvain Guintoli, motorcycle racer

=== July to September ===
- 2 July – Julien Tournut, soccer player
- 5 July – Julien Féret, soccer player
- 5 July – Lionel Gautherie, rugby union player
- 7 July – Julien Doré, singer
- 7 July – Samuel Nadeau, basketball player
- 16 July – Claire Febvay, diver
- 17 July – Wilfried Dalmat, soccer player
- 21 July – Cédric Joqueviel, soccer player
- 22 July – Xavier de Rosnay, musician
- 27 July – Jean-François Kornetzky, soccer player
- 28 July – Grégory Cerdan, soccer player
- 28 July – Benoît Leroy, soccer player
- 4 August – Jean-Philippe Grandclaude, rugby union player
- 16 August – Valentin Courrent, rugby union player
- 1 September – Lou Doillon, model and actress
- 6 September – Stéphane Dumont, soccer player
- 8 September – Sébastien Carole, soccer player
- 26 September – Xavier Barrau, soccer player
- 27 September – Adrianna Lamalle, athlete
- 28 September – Nolwenn Leroy, singer and songwriter

=== October to December ===
- 4 October – Grégory Christ, soccer player
- 4 October – Nicolas Durand, rugby union player
- 11 October – Emmanuel Leconte, actor
- 18 October – Thierry Amiel, singer and songwriter
- 22 November – Mathieu Bodmer, soccer player
- 27 November – David Bellion, soccer player
- 30 November – Clémence Poésy, actress
- 23 December – Grégory Gaultier, squash player
- 25 December – Yoann Langlet, soccer player

== Deaths ==
=== January to June ===
- 2 January – Victor Fontan, cyclist (born 1892).
- 6 January – Louis Poterat, lyricist (born 1901).
- 13 January – Marcel Camus, film director (born 1912).
- 9 February – Marthe Richard, prostitute, spy and politician (born 1889).
- 20 February – René Dubos, microbiologist, experimental pathologist, environmentalist and humanist (born 1901).
- 3 March – Georges Perec, novelist, filmmaker and essayist (born 1936).
- 26 March – Lisette de Brinon, socialite and collaborator (born 1896).
- 15 April – Louis de Guiringaud, politician and Minister (born 1911).
- 16 April – Gabriel Auphan, Admiral (born 1894).
- 29 April – Raymond Bussières, actor (born 1907).
- 8 June – Jean Wiener, pianist and composer (born 1896).
- 29 June – Pierre Balmain, fashion designer (born 1914).

=== July to December ===
- 12 July – Raymond Borderie, film producer (born 1897).
- 18 July – Jacques Pras, cyclist (born 1924).
- 7 August – Jean Beaufret, philosopher and Germanist (born 1907).
- 15 August – Maurice Gallay, footballer (born 1902)
- 19 August – Claude Piel, aircraft designer (born 1921).
- 11 September – Albert Soboul, historian (born 1914).
- 13 September – Marius Canard, orientalist (born 1888).
- 10 October – Jean Effel, painter, illustrator and journalist (born 1908).
- 17 October – Antoine Béthouart, general (born 1889).
- 18 October – Pierre Mendès France, politician and Prime Minister of France (born 1907).
- 22 October – Savitri Devi, writer and philosopher (born 1905).
- 3 November – André Chilo, rugby union player (born 1898).
- 5 November – Jacques Tati, comedic filmmaker (born 1907).
- 5 November – Yves Ciampi, film director (born 1921).
- 11 November – Marcel Paul, trade unionist and communist politician (born 1900).
- 21 November – Pierre Gaxotte, historian (born 1895).
- 30 November – Martha Desrumeaux, militant communist and member of the French Resistance (born 1897).
- 17 December – Philipp Jarnach, composer (born 1892).
- 19 December – Jean-Jacques Grunenwald, organist, composer and architect (born 1911).
- 24 December – Louis Aragon, poet and novelist (born 1897).

=== Full date unknown ===
- Armand Barbault, chemist and alchemist (born 1906).
- Andrée Clair, writer (born 1916).
- Édouard Joly, aircraft designer (born 1898)
- Georges Neveux, dramatist and poet (born 1900).
