= 1984 in France =

- Decades: 1960s; 1970s; 1980s; 1990s; 2000s
- See also: History of France; Timeline of French history; List of years in France

Events from the year 1984 in France.

== Incumbents ==
- President: François Mitterrand
- Prime Minister: Pierre Mauroy (until 17 July), Laurent Fabius (starting 17 July)

== Events ==
- 21 April – The Renault Espace, Europe's first production people carrier, is launched.
- October – Launch of the new "Supercinque" Renault 5, a new version of the hugely popular supermini which debuted 12 years ago and has been a huge sales success for the French carmaker.
- 27 June – The France national football team wins a major tournament for the first time, beating Spain 2–0 as the host nation in the Parc des Princes.
- 13 July – Opening of the Musée de la Révolution française.
- 16 October – the Murder of Grégory Villemin
- 4 November – Canal+, a satellite and cable multi channels television station, a first regular broadcasting service to start.

== Sport ==
- 12 June – UEFA European Championship begins in France.
- 27 June – UEFA Euro 1984 ends, won by France.
- 29 June – Tour de France begins.
- 22 July – Tour de France ends, won by Laurent Fignon.

== Births ==
=== January to March ===
- 5 January – Laurent Mohellebi, soccer player.
- 6 January – Serisay Barthelemy, soccer player.
- 9 January – Kalifa Cissé, soccer player.
- 10 January – Sigamary Diarra, soccer player.
- 10 January – Sébastien Le Toux, soccer player.
- 19 January – Aurélien Passeron, cyclist.
- 22 January – Florian Chauche, politician.
- 23 January – Stéphane Besle, soccer player.
- 27 January – Stéphen Drouin, soccer player.
- 4 February – Souleimane Konate, kickboxer and martial artist.
- 6 February – Benjamin Thiéry, rugby union player.
- 8 February – Jérôme Cellier, soccer player.
- 14 February – Rémi Gomis, soccer player.
- 19 February – David Fleurival, soccer player.
- 25 February – Jacques Faty, soccer player.
- 1 March – Robin Desserne, soccer player.
- 2 March – David Leray, soccer player.
- 4 March – Nicolas Raynier, soccer player.
- 7 March – Cédric Collet, soccer player.
- 7 March – Mathieu Flamini, soccer player.
- 15 March – Badradine Belloumou, soccer player.
- 16 March – Laurent Agouazi, soccer player.
- 21 March – Grégory Mallet, swimmer.
- 22 March – Stéphane Darbion, soccer player.
- 22 March – Kévin Jacmot, soccer player.
- 24 March – Benoît Assou-Ekotto, soccer player.

=== April to June ===
- 2 April – Nicolas Lapierre, motor racing driver.
- 2 April – Jérémy Morel, soccer player.
- 10 April – Damien Perquis, soccer player.
- 11 April – Sébastien Turgot, cyclist.
- 16 April – Romain Feillu, cyclist.
- 24 April – Sekou Baradji, soccer player.
- 24 April – Jérémy Berthod, soccer player.
- 27 April – Fabien Gilot, swimmer.
- 30 April – Jean Calvé, soccer player.
- 1 May – Therry Racon, soccer player.
- 2 May – Yann Huguet, cyclist.
- 2 May – Pierre Piskor, soccer player.
- 17 May – Vincent Durand, soccer player.
- 18 May – Simon Pagenaud, motor racing driver.
- 29 May
  - Gauthier Grumier, épée fencer.
  - Alysson Paradis, actress
- 3 June – Jean-Jacques Mandrichi, soccer player.
- 13 June – Bérangère Schuh, archer.
- 20 June – Amir Haddad, Israeli-French singer and songwriter
- 23 June – Sébastien Grax, soccer player.
- 26 June – Indila, singer and songwriter

=== July to September ===
- 1 July – Grégory Bourillon, soccer player
- 3 July – Nicolas Roche, cyclist
- 8 July – Youssef Sofiane, soccer player
- 10 July – Michaël Chrétien Basser, soccer player
- 10 July – Laurent Recouderc, tennis player
- 11 July – Sébastien Renouard, soccer player
- 13 July – Jimmy Abdou, soccer player
- 23 July – Yann Jouffre, soccer player
- 25 July – Jean Eudes Demaret, cyclist
- 6 August – Sofia Essaïdi, singer
- 13 August – Youssouf Kanté, soccer player
- 16 August – Hadrien Feraud, jazz-fusion bassist
- 21 August – Alizée, singer
- 21 August – Luigi Glombard, soccer player
- 26 August – Jérémy Clément, soccer player
- 9 September – Renaud Cohade, soccer player
- 9 September – Vincent Laban, soccer player
- 17 September – Laurent Merlin, soccer player
- 17 September – Elsa N'Guessan, freestyle swimmer
- 18 September – Christian Nadé, soccer player
- 18 September – Mathieu Perget, cyclist
- 20 September – Brian Joubert, figure skater
- 28 September – Mathieu Valbuena, soccer player

=== October to December ===
- 2 October – Marion Bartoli, tennis player.
- 3 October – Anthony Le Tallec, soccer player.
- 6 October – Arnaud Gérard, cyclist.
- 10 October
  - Jean-Baptiste Grange, alpine skier.
  - Cherie, singer.
- 13 October – Nicolas Fauvergue, soccer player.
- 16 October – François Pervis, cyclist.
- 26 October – Mathieu Crépel, snowboarder.
- 10 November – Thierry Hupond, cyclist.
- 25 November – Gaspard Ulliel, actor (died 2022).
- 26 November – Vincent Jérôme, cyclist.
- 7 December – Céline Laporte, athlete.
- 12 December – Mathieu Ladagnous, cyclist.
- 12 December – Jérémy Perbet, soccer player.

== Deaths ==
=== January to June ===
- 7 January – Alfred Kastler, physicist, Nobel Prize laureate (born 1902).
- 21 January – Roger Blin, comedian and actor (born 1907).
- 8 February – Philippe Ariès, medievalist and historian (born 1914).
- 11 February – Arlette Marchal, actress (born 1902).
- 13 February – Pierre Brambilla, road cyclist (born 1919).
- 23 February – Maurice Tabard, surrealist photographer (born 1897)
- 5 March – Pierre Cochereau, organist and composer (born 1924).
- 5 March – Gérard Lebovici, film producer, editor and impresario (born 1932).
- 7 March – Charles Pisot, mathematician (born 1910).
- 13 March – François Le Lionnais, chemical engineer and mathematician (born 1901).
- 23 March – Jean Prouvé, architect and designer (born 1901).
- 18 April – Pierre Frank, Trotskyist leader (born 1905).
- 25 April – Jean Borthayre, operatic baritone (born 1901).
- 2 June – François de Menthon, politician and professor of law (born 1900).
- 12 June – François Ducaud-Bourget, priest (born 1897).
- 25 June – Michel Foucault, philosopher, historian, critic and sociologist (born 1926).
- 30 June – Henri Fabre, aviator and aircraft designer (born 1882).

=== July to December ===
- 8 July – Brassaï, photographer, sculptor and filmmaker (born 1899).
- 31 July – Paul Le Flem, composer and musician (born 1881).
- 11 August – Marcel Balsa, motor racing driver (born 1901).
- 9 September – Yılmaz Güney, Kurdish film director, screenwriter, novelist, actor and communist political activist (born 1937).
- 12 September – Yvon Petra, tennis player (born 1916).
- 1 October – Hellé Nice, model, dancer and motor racing driver (born 1900).
- 16 October – Grégory Villemin, murdered infant (born in 1980).
- 21 October – François Truffaut, screenwriter, film director, producer and actor (born 1932).
- 25 October – Pascale Ogier, actress (born 1958).
- 29 October – Jacques Adnet, designer, architect and interior designer (born 1900).
- 31 October – Denise Vernac, actress (born 1916).
- 1 November – Marcel Moyse, flautist (born 1889).
- 7 November – Marcel Barbu, politician (born 1907).
- 27 November – Luc Etienne (Périn), writer (born 1908).

== See also ==
- List of French films of 1984
