= Chort (disambiguation) =

Chort is a demon in Slavic mythology. The word may also refer to:

- Jordan Chort, a French football player
- an alternative name for Theta Leonis, a star in the constellation Leo
- an alternative name for the Hortaya Borzaya, a dog breed
- a character in the science-fiction novel The Icarus Hunt by Timothy Zahn

== See also ==
- Tchort (born 1974), Norwegian musician
- Chert
