= Ceiller =

Ceiller is a surname, and may refer to:

- Alfred Cellier (1844–1891), English composer, orchestrator and conductor
- Elizabeth Cellier (the "Popish Midwife"), English Catholic midwife who stood trial for treason for her alleged part in the "Meal-Tub Plot"
- François Cellier (1849–1914), English conductor and composer
- Frank Cellier (actor) (1884–1948), English actor
- Jérôme Cellier (born 1984), French footballer
- Marcel Cellier (1925–2013), Swiss organist, ethnomusicologist and music producer
- Peter Cellier (born 1928), English actor

== See also ==
- Ceillier
