= Bouabdellah =

Bouabdellah, also sometimes transliterated Bouabdallah (Arabic: بوعبدالله) is an Arabic surname and given name.

== Surname ==
Notable people with this surname include:

- Madjid Bouabdellah (born 1981), Algerian football player
- Zoulikha Bouabdellah (born 1977), Russian-born Algerian artist

== Given name ==
Notable people with this given name include:

- Bouabdellah Daoud (born 1978), Algerian footballer
- Bouabdellah Tahri (born 1978), Algerian runner
