= De Gea =

De Gea is a surname. Notable people with the surname include:

- David de Gea (born 1990), Spanish footballer
- José David de Gea, Spanish Grand Prix motorcycle racer
- Nicolas de Géa (born 1983), French footballer

== See also ==
- Gea de Albarracín, a municipality located in Aragon, Spain
