= Claudio Randrianantoanina =

Malagasy footballer (born 1987)

Personal information
- Full name: Claudio Randrianantoanina
- Date of birth: 28 July 1987 (age 39)
- Place of birth: Paris, France
- Height: 1.81 m (5 ft 11 1/2 in)
- Position: Midfielder

Team information
- Current team: without club

Youth career
- 2006–2008: Créteil B

Senior career*
Years	Team	Apps	(Gls)
2008	Créteil	3	(0)

International career
2007	Madagascar	2	
- * Club domestic league appearances and goals

Claudio Randrianantoanina (born 28 July 1987) is a former football player. Born in France, he represented Madagascar at international level.

He is the younger brother of Marco Randrianantoanina.
