= Romain Vincelot =

French footballer (born 1985)

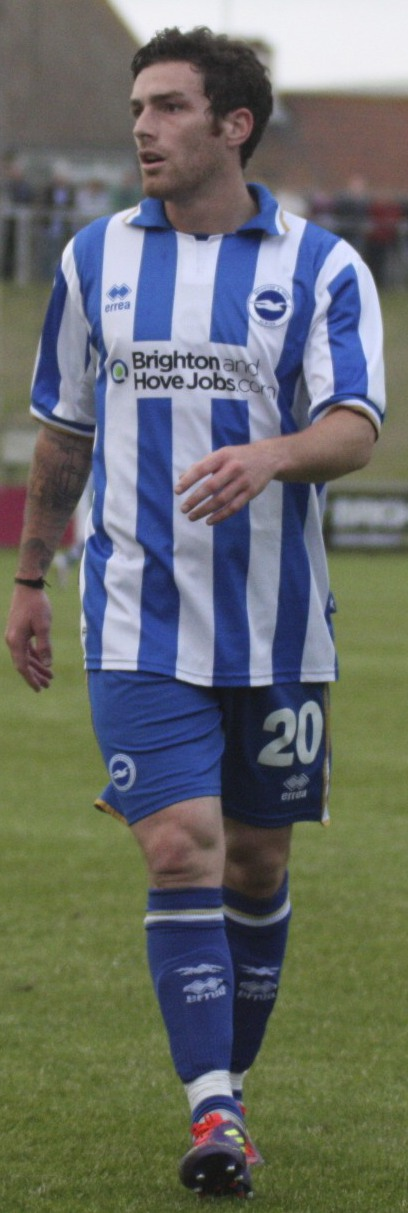
- Vincelot with Brighton & Hove Albion in 2012

Personal information
- Full name: Romain Marcel Georges Vincelot
- Date of birth: 29 October 1985 (age 40)
- Place of birth: Poitiers, France
- Height: 1.78 m (5 ft 10 in)
- Position: Midfielder

Senior career*
Years	Team	Apps	(Gls)
2004–2008	Chamois Niortais	48	(1)
2008–2009	Gueugnon	20	(0)
2010–2011	Dagenham & Redbridge	57	(13)
2011–2013	Brighton & Hove Albion	15	(1)
2012	→ Gillingham (loan)	9	(1)
2013–2015	Leyton Orient	81	(3)
2015–2016	Coventry City	45	(4)
2016–2018	Bradford City	83	(6)
2018–2019	Crawley Town	12	(0)
2019–2020	Shrewsbury Town	5	(0)
2020–2021	Stevenage	26	(0)
Total		401	(29)
- * Club domestic league appearances and goals

Romain Marcel Georges Vincelot (born 29 October 1985) is a French former professional footballer who played as a midfielder in France and England across a 17-year career.

He played for Chamois Niortais, Gueugnon, Dagenham & Redbridge, Brighton & Hove Albion, Gillingham, Leyton Orient, Coventry City, Bradford City, Crawley Town, Shrewsbury Town and Stevenage.

== Career ==
=== France ===
Born in Poitiers, Vincelot started his career with Chamois Niortais, where he made 46 league appearances in four years, three of which in Ligue 2 and one in the Championnat National (third tier). (Note: Romain Vincelot – French league stats at LFP – also available in French (archived)) He moved to FC Gueugnon in 2008 and played 20 league games for the side during the 2008–09 Championnat National campaign.

=== Dagenham & Redbridge ===
Vincelot was released by Gueugnon in the summer of 2009 and spent the following six months without a team before signing for Dagenham & Redbridge on 22 January 2010. He made his Football League debut the next day, coming on as a substitute in the 2–1 defeat to Shrewsbury Town. He scored his first goal for the club in a 2–1 home win over Burton Albion on 17 April. Despite being signed as a full-back, the Dagenham manager John Still played him the centre of midfield. He played in the winning team in the League Two play-off final at Wembley on 30 May, when they defeated Rotherham United 3–2.

In the 2010–11 season, Vincelot ended as top league scorer for Dagenham & Redbridge with 12 goals, although they were relegated back to League Two. This included a header in each half of a 2–0 win over East London neighbours Leyton Orient on 4 September 2010.

=== Brighton & Hove Albion ===
On 15 July 2011, Vincelot signed for newly promoted Championship side Brighton & Hove Albion on a two-year deal for an undisclosed fee estimated as £100,000. He made his debut on 9 August in a League Cup first round 1–0 win over Gillingham. On 26 November, he scored his only goal of 20 appearances for the Seagulls, the winner in a 2–1 victory over Coventry City at the Falmer Stadium. He was sent off after six minutes of a 1–0 loss at home to Burnley on 17 December for fighting Marvin Bartley, with teammate Ashley Barnes joining him six minutes later.

Having taken no part for Brighton in the 2012–13 season, Vincelot joined League Two side Gillingham on a two-month loan deal on 26 October 2012. He made nine appearances for the Gills and scored on his debut for the "Gills", and scored the only goal of a win at AFC Wimbledon on his debut a day after signing.

=== Leyton Orient ===
On 31 January 2013, Vincelot left Brighton after his contract was terminated. A week later he signed a short-term contract at League One side Leyton Orient, followed by a three-year contract at the end of the season.

At Orient, Vincelot became a regular in the first team during the 2013–14 season, appearing in the League One play-off final defeat to Rotherham United at Wembley. On 27 August 2014, he scored Orient's winner in the 1–0 League Cup victory over Premier League Aston Villa at Villa Park.

=== Coventry City ===
On 8 July 2015, Vincelot signed a two-year contract at Coventry City for an undisclosed fee.

=== Bradford City ===
After spending only one season at Coventry City, Vincelot moved to Bradford City in July 2016, on a two-year contract for an undisclosed fee. He replaced Stephen Darby as Bradford's captain.

=== Crawley Town ===
On 19 July 2018, Vincelot signed for EFL League Two club Crawley Town on a two-year deal for an undisclosed fee.

=== Shrewsbury Town ===
The following January, he moved to EFL League One club Shrewsbury Town, managed by his former Coventry teammate Sam Ricketts. He made his debut for "the Shrews" on 2 February, a 3–0 home defeat to Luton Town. Having not played since August, in October 2019 he underwent hip resurfacing, and was reportedly the first footballer to undergo that surgery that received attention when performed on tennis player Andy Murray.

He was released by the club on 11 June 2020.

=== Stevenage ===
On 24 July 2020, Vincelot signed for League Two club Stevenage, making him the club's sixth summer signing. At the end of the 2020–21 season, he announced his retirement aged 35.

== Career statistics ==
Appearances and goals by club, season and competition
Club	Season	League			National cup		League cup		Other		Total	
Club	Season	Division	Apps	Goals	Apps	Goals	Apps	Goals	Apps	Goals	Apps	Goals
Chamois Niortais	2004–05	Ligue 2	3	0	0	0	0	0	0	0	3	0
Chamois Niortais	2005–06	Championnat National	30	1	0	0	0	0	0	0	30	1
Chamois Niortais	2006–07	Ligue 2	9	0	0	0	0	0	0	0	9	0
Chamois Niortais	2007–08	Ligue 2	6	0	1	0	0	0	0	0	7	0
Chamois Niortais	Total		48	1	1	0	0	0	0	0	49	1
Gueugnon	2008–09	Championnat National	20	0	0	0	2	0	0	0	22	0
Dagenham & Redbridge	2009–10	League Two	11	1	0	0	0	0	0	0	11	1
Dagenham & Redbridge	2010–11	League One	46	12	2	0	1	0	1 (Note: Appearance(s) in Football League Trophy)	0	50	12
Dagenham & Redbridge	Total		57	13	2	0	1	0	1	0	61	13
Brighton & Hove Albion	2011–12	Championship	15	1	2	0	3	0	0	0	20	1
Brighton & Hove Albion	2012–13	Championship	0	0	0	0	0	0	0	0	0	0
Brighton & Hove Albion	Total		15	1	2	0	3	0	0	0	20	1
Gillingham (loan)	2012–13	League Two	9	1	2	0	0	0	0	0	11	1
Leyton Orient	2012–13	League One	15	1	0	0	0	0	0	0	15	1
Leyton Orient	2013–14	League One	39	0	2	0	2	0	5 (Note: Two appearances in Football League Trophy and three in League One play-offs)	0	48	0
Leyton Orient	2014–15	League One	27	2	0	0	3	2	3	0	33	4
Leyton Orient	Total		81	3	2	0	5	2	8	0	96	5
Coventry City	2015–16	League One	45	4	0	0	1	0	0	0	46	4
Bradford City	2016–17	League One	45	2	0	0	1	0	5 (Note: Two appearances in EFL Trophy, three in League One play-offs)	0	51	2
Bradford City	2017–18	League One	38	4	3	1	1	0	1 (Note: Appearance(s) in EFL Trophy)	0	43	5
Bradford City	Total		83	6	3	1	2	0	6	0	94	7
Crawley Town	2018–19	League Two	12	0	0	0	1	0	2	0	15	0
Shrewsbury Town	2018–19	League One	3	0	2	0	0	0	0	0	5	0
Shrewsbury Town	2019–20	League One	2	0	0	0	0	0	0	0	2	0
Shrewsbury Town	Total		5	0	2	0	0	0	0	0	7	0
Stevenage	2020–21	League Two	26	0	2	0	1	0	2	0	31	0
Career total			401	29	16	1	16	2	19	0	452	32

== Honours ==
Dagenham & Redbridge

- Football League Two play-offs: 2010
