= 1982 French cantonal elections =

Cantonale elections to renew canton general councillors were held in France on 14 and 21 March 1982. The left, in power since 1981, lost 8 and 98 seats to the right, which controlled 59 presidencies out of 95. The Socialists only lost 10 seats, but the Communists lost 45.

== Electoral system ==
The cantonales elections use the same system as the regional or legislative elections. There is a 10% threshold (10% of registered voters) needed to proceed to the second round.

== National results ==
Runoff results missing

Party/Alliance	% (first round)	Seats
PS	29.9%	504
UDF	18.8%	460
RPR	17.9%	390
PCF	15.9%	191
Miscellaneous Right	12.9%	364
MRG	1.6%	61
Miscellaneous Left	1.7%	41
Far-Left	0.6%	1
Ecologists	0.4%	2
FN	0.1%	0
