= Frédéric Laurent =

French/French Guianese footballer (born 1975)

Personal information
- Full name: Frédéric Laurent
- Date of birth: 21 November 1975 (age 50)
- Place of birth: Paris, France
- Height: 5 ft 10 in (1.78 m)
- Position: Midfielder

Senior career*
Years	Team	Apps	(Gls)
1995–1996	Metz	0	(0)
1996–1997	Forbach	10	(2)
1997–2001	Tours	93	(15)
2001–2003	Romorantin	62	(16)
2003–2007	Dijon	102	(18)
2007	Chamois Niortais	7	(0)
2007–2008	Stade Lavallois	12	(2)
2008–2010	FC Martigues		
- * Club domestic league appearances and goals

Frédéric Laurent (born 21 November 1975), is a French/French Guianese former football midfielder.

He previously played for French clubs including Tours FC, SO Romorantin and Dijon FCO.
