= Chortai =

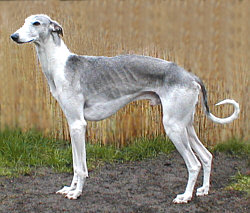
- Other names: Chortaj; Eastern Greyhound; Ukrainian Greyhound; Russian Greyhound
- Origin: Ukraine, Russia
- Foundation stock: Krymstaja & Gorskaja (both extinct)

The Chortai, sometimes spelt Chortaj, is a breed of sighthound from Ukraine and Russia.

The Chortai is said to resemble a cross between a Greyhound and a short haired Borzoi, being a quite heavily built running hound but nevertheless displaying typical sighthound features.

The Chortai is believed to have been developed from the now extinct Krymstaja and Gorskaja breeds and was a favourite breed of the Russian nobility; one was exhibited at the London Zoo in 1829 as a Russian Greyhound although otherwise they have rarely been seen outside their own country. After the 1917 October Revolution, remaining dogs from the abandoned kennels of the nobility were widely crossed with local hound varieties producing what is now known as the South Russian Steppe Hound, despite this the breed received recognition from the Soviet authorities at the Cynological Congress in Moscow in 1952. The breed's numbers steadily declined under the Soviet Union to the point of near extinction, but with the collapse of the Soviet Union there has been renewed interest in pre-revolutionary breeds within Russia and attempts have been made to rescue the breed.

The Chortai is typically hunted in the traditional Russian manner, with the hunters mounted on horseback accompanied by a brace of hounds and a raptor.

== See also ==
- List of dog breeds
