= Samuel Nadeau =

French basketball player (born 1982)

Samuel Nadeau (born July 7, 1982 in Colombes) is a French basketball player who played for French Pro A clubs Limoges during the 2003-2004 season and Vichy during the 2004-2005 season.
