= Arnaud Gonzalez =

French footballer (born 1977)

Personal information
- Date of birth: 24 August 1977 (age 49)
- Place of birth: Dijon, France
- Height: 5 ft 10 in (1.78 m)
- Positions: Attacking midfielder; striker

Youth career
- 1992–1995: Auxerre

Senior career*
Years	Team	Apps	(Gls)
1995–2005	Auxerre	56	(4)
2000–2001	→ Beauvais (loan)	34	(2)
2005–2006	Guingamp	23	(3)
2006–2013	Chamois Niortais	194	(41)
Total		307	(50)

International career
1992–1993	France U16	4	(0)
1993–1994	France U17	6	(0)
1994–1995	France U18	11	(1)
1995–1996	France U19	11	(1)
1996–1997	France U21	5	(0)
- * Club domestic league appearances and goals

Arnaud Gonzalez (born 24 August 1977) is a French football coach and former player who is assistant coach for Ligue 2 club Niort. who played as an attacking midfielder. Gonzalez started his career with AJ Auxerre, joining the club's youth setup at the age of 14. He made his senior debut in 1996, but failed to break into the first-team during the early stages of his career. Whilst with Auxerre, he represented France at under-19 level and was part of the team that won the 1996 UEFA European Under-19 Football Championship.

Gonzalez spent the 2000–01 season on loan at AS Beauvais Oise, where he scored two goals in 34 league matches. He then returned to Auxerre for four seasons before joining EA Guingamp in the summer of 2005. After one season with Guingamp he signed for Chamois Niortais and was a member of the squad that suffered successive relegations in 2008 and 2009, before winning the Championnat de France amateur Group C in 2010. He remained with Niort until 11 February 2013, when he announced his immediate retirement from football.

== Early career ==
Gonzalez was born in Dijon, Côte-d'Or, on 24 August 1977. He played junior football with local team Marsannay-la-Côte until 1992, when he joined the youth setup at AJ Auxerre at the age of 14. He played in the Auxerre side that won the France Under-17s cup in 1994. Gonzalez was selected to represent the France national under-19 football team at the UEFA European Under-19 Football Championship in 1996. He played alongside footballers such as Thierry Henry, Nicolas Anelka, Mikael Silvestre and Yoann Bigné in the team that won the competition, defeating Spain in the final.

== Senior career ==
Gonzalez was promoted to the Auxerre first-team in 1995 and made his Ligue 1 debut on 27 January 1996 in the 1–0 victory against Le Havre AC, as a replacement for Christophe Cocard, who was suspended for the game. Gonzalez did not make another league appearance for the club during the 1995–96 season as they won Ligue 1 and were crowned champions of France. He spent the whole of the following campaign in the reserves, scoring 9 goals in 21 matches. Gonzalez returned to the first-team towards the end of the 1997–98 season, and scored his first senior goal for Auxerre in the 2–1 win away at SC Bastia on 7 March 1998. He also made one brief appearance in the UEFA Cup. Gonzalez attributed his lack of first-team experience in his early years with Auxerre to the reluctance of manager Guy Roux to rotate the squad, even when players were carrying injuries. After making only one more appearance for the club between 1998 and 2000, Gonzalez was put on the list of players available to be loaned to Ligue 2 clubs in the summer of 2000.

AS Beauvais Oise manager Jacky Bonnevay expressed an interest in Gonzalez, and he joined the team on a season-long loan for the 2000–01 campaign. He impressed the manager in pre-season, scoring the winning goal in a 2–1 friendly win against Red Star Saint-Ouen. Gonzalez made his full Beauvais debut in the club's first league match of the season, a 1–3 home defeat to Montpellier HSC on 29 July 2000, and played in all of the team's opening 17 matches of the campaign. After three matches out of the team, he returned as a substitute for the 2–0 loss to FC Gueugnon on 29 November 2000. He started the following match, and scored his first goal for the club in the 1–1 draw with AS Nancy. Gonzalez went on to score twice in 34 league games for Beauvais before returning to Auxerre for the beginning of the 2001–02 season.

Upon his return, Gonzalez again found himself on the fringes of the first-team, making 12 appearances throughout the campaign, mostly as a substitute. Auxerre qualified for the UEFA Champions League for the following season, and Gonzalez played four matches in the competition, including a substitute appearance against Arsenal on 3 October 2002. He continued to play for Auxerre until the summer of 2005, scoring four goals in a total of 56 matches for the club. Gonzalez signed for EA Guingamp, who had just been relegated from Ligue 1, on a free transfer for the 2005–06 season. He made his debut for the club on 5 August 2005 in the 0–0 draw away at FC Istres. Two matches later, he scored his first Guingamp goal in the 2–1 win against his hometown team Dijon FCO. He then netted in consecutive league matches for the first time in his career, firstly scoring the winning goal in the victory over FC Sète and then adding to his tally in the side's 1–2 loss to FC Lorient.

Gonzalez left Guingamp in 2006 after just one season, and he was signed on a free transfer by Chamois Niortais, who were managed at the time by Philippe Hinschberger. Niort were new arrivals to Ligue 2, having won promotion via the Championnat National the previous season. Gonzalez made his competitive debut for the side on 28 July 2006 in the 1–1 draw with AC Ajaccio and started each of the club's first 13 games of the season. He scored his first Niort goal in the 2–2 draw against SM Caen on 15 September. He kept his place in the team and netted his second goal for the club two months later in the 2–0 win over LB Châteauroux. On 9 February 2007, Gonzalez scored the winner after coming on as a substitute in the 3–2 win against Stade de Reims. He ended the season with three goals in seven matches as Niort finished 16th in the division to secure their Ligue 2 status for another season. In his first season with Niort, Gonzalez had scored six goals in 33 games, his highest number of goals in a season at the time.

Gonzalez retained his place in the Niort first-team for the start of the 2007–08 season. He scored the only goal of the match in the 1–0 win against Montpellier on 24 August 2007. However, he suffered two broken ribs in the match and had to be replaced by Djibril Konaté at half time. The injury forced him to spend more than two months out of the side, returning to the team for the 0–1 loss to Clermont Foot on 2 November. Gonzalez scored only once between November 2007 and May 2008 as Niort struggled in the league, occupying a relegation place for some part of the season. He netted his first goal in over eight months when he scored the third in a 3–0 win against Dijon on 2 May 2008. He was on the scoresheet again in the following match, opening the scoring in the 2–0 victory over Ajaccio. Niort entered the final match of the season against US Boulogne requiring a win or a draw to avoid relegation. Gonzalez was booked in the game and replaced by Benoît Leroy in the 68th minute while the match was still goalless. The team appeared to have done enough, but Boulogne scored in the third minute of injury time to relegate Niort to the Championnat National, meaning that Gonzalez would play in the third tier of French football for the first time in his career.

With the perceived goal threat of Gonzalez and new signing Luigi Glombard, Niort were widely expected to return to Ligue 2 after one season in the National. However, the team found it difficult to score goals and win matches. Despite appearing in almost every match, Gonzalez did not score a goal for the team until 3 April 2009, when he scored in the 3–0 win against FC Sète. Niort slipped further towards the bottom of the table, although Gonzalez did get on the scoresheet in the 2–0 away win against SO Cassis Carnoux on 16 May 2009. He was left out of the side for the final match of the campaign away at Pacy Vallée-d'Eure needing a win to stay in the National. However, Niort could only manage a 0–0 draw, meaning they would be relegated to the Championnat de France amateur (CFA) for the first time since 1970. Despite the relegation, he signed a new contract with Niort to keep him at the club until the summer of 2011. In the first match of the 2009–10 season, Gonzalez scored twice in the 3–0 win against Bordeaux Réserve—the first time he had ever scored two goals in one game. After a nine-match streak without a goal, he then netted in the 3–1 victory over Balma SC before scoring three in two matches against Vendée Luçon Football and Pau FC. Gonzalez achieved four goals in five league matches between 13 March and 10 April 2010. He then scored in the 4–0 win over Pau on 8 May 2010, which confirmed that Niort would be crowned winners of the CFA Group C and gain promotion back to the Championnat National.

Gonzalez scored twice in the side's first match back in the third tier, a 3–2 home win against Rodez on 6 August 2010. He remained an integral part of the Niort team, playing a total of 37 league and cup matches during the 2010–11 campaign. He scored three goals during the final month of the campaign, including two in consecutive matches against Plabennec and Beauvais, and the opening goal in the 2–0 victory against UJA Alfortville on the penultimate matchday, as the team secured an 11th-place finish. Gonzalez carried his form into the 2011–12 season, scoring nine goals in the opening 18 games of the campaign, including two in the 3–0 win against Besançon on 11 November. However, following the winter break, he began to be used more as a substitute, coming on in the last 15 minutes of matches, and he failed to score during the second half of the season as Niort finished as Championnat National runners-up behind Nîmes Olympique, thereby regaining their place in Ligue 2 after four seasons away. In the higher division, Gonzalez was used sparingly by manager Pascal Gastien during the first half of the campaign, making only three starts. He struggled to secure a place in the team thanks to the emergence of new signings such as Greg Houla and the good form of Simon Hébras and in September 2012 he revealed that he would almost certainly retire at the end of the season. On 11 February 2013, Gonzalez announced his immediate retirement from professional football, stating that his interest in playing had waned and that the game had lost its pleasure for him.

== Honours ==
Auxerre

- Ligue 1 champions: 1995–96

Chamois Niortais

- Championnat de France amateur Group C winners: 2009–10
- Championnat National runners-up: 2011–12

France U19

- UEFA European Under-19 Football Championship winners: 1996
