= Yvan Kibundu =

French footballer (born 1989)

Personal information
- Date of birth: 26 March 1989 (age 37)
- Place of birth: Melun, France
- Height: 1.77 m (5 ft 10 in)
- Position: Midfielder

Team information
- Current team: Stade Poitevin
- Number: 24

Senior career*
Years	Team	Apps	(Gls)
2007–2009	Niort	20	(0)
2009–2010	Lens B		
2010–2012	Tours	3	(0)
2012–2014	Luçon	45	(0)
2014–2018	Romorantin	106	(9)
2018–2021	Martigues	54	(3)
2021–	Stade Poitevin	93	(4)
- * Club domestic league appearances and goals as of 4 December 2025

Yvan Kibundu (born 26 March 1989) is a French football player who plays for Championnat National 1 club Stade Poitevin.

== Career ==
He played first for Chamois Niortais and scored his first goal for this club in the 2–1 Coupe de la Ligue defeat to Créteil on 3 September 2008.
