= Djibril Konaté =

Malian footballer

Personal information
- Full name: Djibril Konaté
- Date of birth: 2 September 1980 (age 46)
- Place of birth: Kayes, Mali
- Height: 1.94 m (6 ft 4 1/2 in)
- Position: Defender

Team information
- Current team: Fontenay-le-Comte

Senior career*
Years	Team	Apps	(Gls)
1997–2003	Mantes	3	(0)
2003–2005	Fontenay-le-Comte	64	(1)
2005–2008	Chamois Niortais	57	(2)
2009	Fontenay-le-Comte	13	(2)
2009–2013	Chamois Niortais	121	(4)
2013–2014	Angers	30	(0)
2014–2016	Laval	61	(0)
2016–2017	Les Herbiers VF	22	(0)
2017–	Fontenay-le-Comte		
- * Club domestic league appearances and goals as of 30 June 2017 (UTC)

Djibril Konaté (born 2 September 1980) is a Malian association footballer who plays for Vendée Fontenay Foot. He usually plays as a right-back, but can also play as a centre-half and a defensive midfielder.

He has played his entire career in France, with Mantes, Fontenay, Chamois Niortais and Angers and he was part of the Niort side which won the Championnat National in the 2005–06 season. Standing at a height of 1.94 metres, Konaté was the tallest player to play for Chamois Niortais during their professional era, between 1985 and 2009.

== Personal life ==
Konaté was born on 2 September 1980 in the Malian city of Kayes, but his family moved to France whilst he was young. He has a brother, named Youssouf, who also played semi-professional football for Mantes, making two appearances in the Championnat de France amateur in the 2004–05 season.

== Career ==
=== Early career ===
Konaté started his senior career in 1997 playing for amateur outfit Mantes in the Championnat de France amateur 2, the fifth tier of the French football league system. In the 2001–02 season the team celebrated promotion to the Championnat de France amateur after finishing third in their division. In a higher division, Konaté found his first-team opportunities limited, making just three league appearances in the 2002–03 season as the team narrowly avoided relegation, finishing in 15th position in the CFA Group A.

=== Fontenay-le-Comte ===
At the end of that season, Konaté's contract came to an end and he was released by Mantes. In the summer of 2003, he signed for semi-professional CFA group D side Fontenay-le-Comte. Konaté played a major role in the next two seasons for Fontenay, attracting interest from higher division clubs. At the end of the 2004–05 season, Fontenay were demoted from the CFA, despite finishing 11th in their group and this signalled the end of Konaté's time with the club.

=== Chamois Niortais ===
In July 2005, Konaté signed his first professional contract with then Championnat National side Chamois Niortais. He was mostly a bit-part player during his first season with the club. He made his début for the Deux-Sèvres club on 4 March 2006, coming on as a substitute replacing Vincent Durand in the 3–1 victory over AS Cherbourg Football, and went on to make two starts in the league, as well as four further substitute appearances, as the team comfortably finished top of the division, gaining promotion to Ligue 2. In his second season, Konaté became an integral part of the Chamois Niortais first-team thanks to his ability to play in a number of positions, his pace, and his accurate corner kicks. Niort finished 16th in their first season back in Ligue 2, avoiding relegation by four points.

The 2007–08 season was a mixed affair for both Konaté and Niort. Despite reaching the last 16 of the Coupe de France, the club performed poorly in the league and were eventually relegated on the final day of the season after conceding a 93rd-minute goal after a mistake by goalkeeper David Klein. Konaté scored the first of his two goals in three seasons for the club on 7 March 2008 in a 2–2 draw with SC Bastia. At the end of the season, because of the relegation Konaté was one of a number of players not offered a new deal by Niort, and he was released in July 2008.

=== Back to Fontenay ===
Konaté was given a trial at Polish Ekstraklasa side Legia Warszawa in August 2008, but he played poorly as the team lost 0–2 to Jagiellonia Białystok and was not awarded a contract. Konaté was unable to find a new club in the summer transfer window, and played the first few months of the season alongside other out-of-contract players with the National Union of Professional Footballers (UNFP). He had to wait until the January transfer window in 2009 to return to his former team, Fontenay-le-Comte. Konaté signed a six-month contract and made thirteen league appearances, scoring two goals, the first of which came in the 3–1 win over SO Châtellerault on 21 March 2009, as the side achieved a fourth-placed finish in the CFA Group C, missing out on promotion by twelve points.

=== Return to Niort ===
On 25 June 2009, Konaté returned to his recently relegated former club Chamois Niortais on a free transfer as one of a number of former players re-signed by the club as they aimed to return to the Championnat National at the first attempt. He played well in pre-season, scoring two goals in friendly matches, one each against SO Châtellerault and his former club, Vendée Fontenay Foot. The team went on to win promotion from the CFA at the end of the 2009–10 season, thereby returning to the third tier of French football. Two years later, Konaté was an integral part of the team that finished as runners-up in the Championnat National and gained promotion to Ligue 2 for the 2012–13 campaign. However, despite playing 28 league matches that season it was announced that he would not be remaining at Niort the following year.

=== Angers SCO ===
Following the expiry of his contract with Niort, it was revealed on 23 May 2013 that Konaté would join Ligue 2 rivals Angers SCO for the 2013–14 season.

=== Stade Lavallois ===
After a one season with Angers, Konaté moved to the Ligue 2 side Laval in June 2014. He was released at the end of the 2015–16 season.

== Honours ==
Chamois Niortais

- Championnat National champions: 2005–06
- Championnat de France amateur Group C winners: 2009–10

== Career statistics ==
As of 25 May 2014

Club performance
Club	Division	Season	League		Cup		Total	
Club	Division	Season	Apps	Goals	Apps	Goals	Apps	Goals
Mantes	CFA Group A	2002–03	3	0	0	0	3	0
Fontenay-le-Comte	CFA Group D	2003–04	32	0	2	0	34	0
Fontenay-le-Comte	CFA Group D	2004–05	30	1	0	0	30	1
Chamois Niortais	Championnat National	2005–06	7	0	0	0	7	0
Chamois Niortais	Ligue 2	2006–07	26	0	2	0	28	0
Chamois Niortais	Ligue 2	2007–08	24	2	5	0	29	2
Fontenay-le-Comte	CFA Group C	2008–09	13	2	0	0	13	2
Chamois Niortais	CFA Group C	2009–10	32	0	-	-	32	0
Chamois Niortais	Championnat National	2010–11	31	0	1	0	32	0
Chamois Niortais	Championnat National	2011–12	30	2	4	0	34	2
Chamois Niortais	Ligue 2	2012–13	28	2	0	0	28	2
Angers	Ligue 2	2013–14	30	0	6	2	36	2
Total			286	9	20	2	306	11
