= Grégory Cerdan =

French footballer (born 1982)

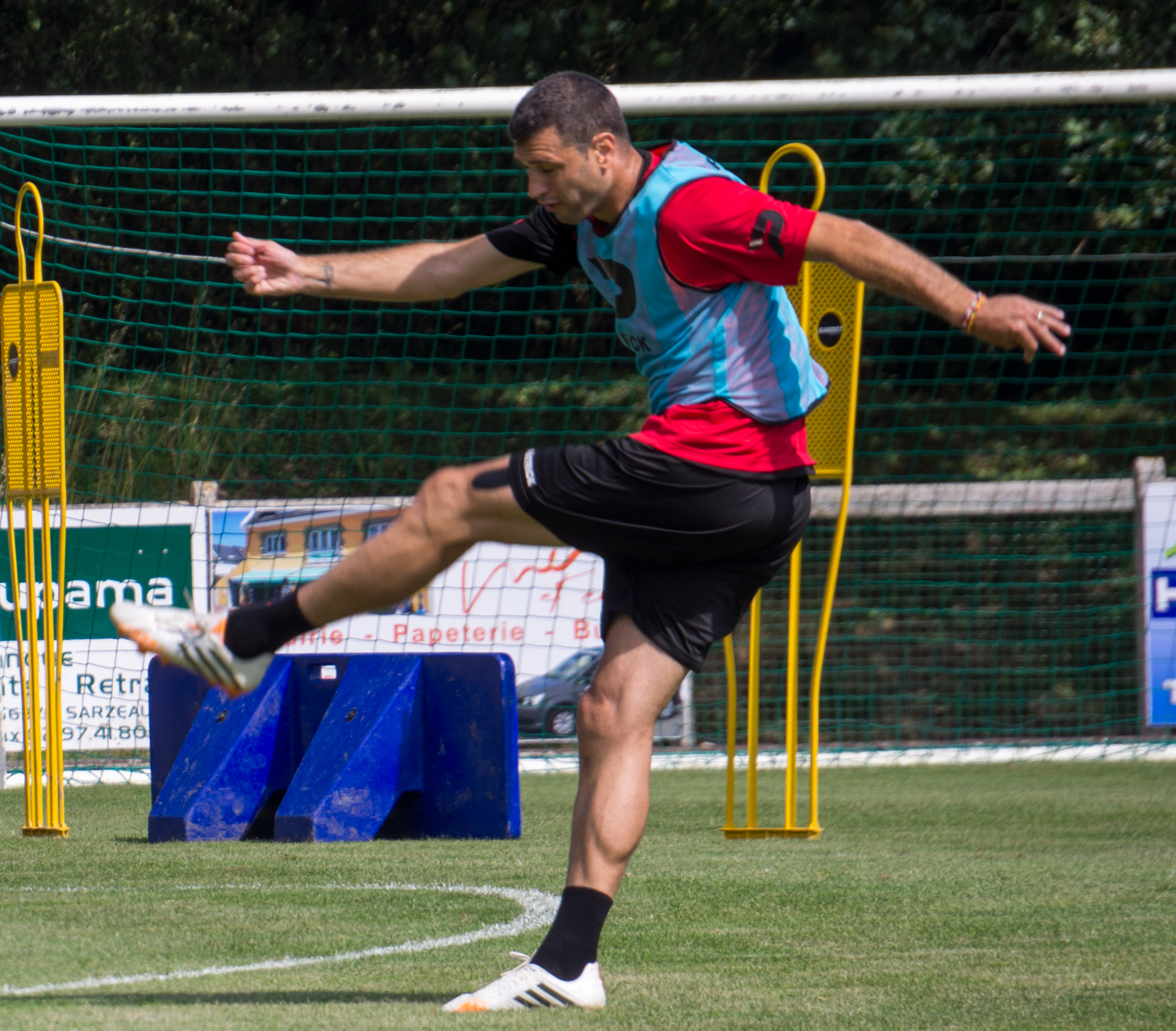
- Cerdan training with Le Mans in 2014

Personal information
- Date of birth: 28 July 1982 (age 44)
- Place of birth: Saint-Denis, France
- Height: 1.90 m (6 ft 3 in)
- Position: Defender

Senior career*
Years	Team	Apps	(Gls)
2003–2004	L'Entente SSG	29	(0)
2004–2011	Le Mans	180	(6)
2012–2014	Guingamp	32	(2)
2014–2016	Le Mans	36	(2)
Total		277	(10)
- * Club domestic league appearances and goals

Grégory Cerdan (born 28 July 1982) is a French former professional footballer who played as a defender. He played for Le Mans and Guingamp in Ligue 1.

== Career ==
On 9 September 2014, Cerdan rejoined his former club Le Mans FC. He retired in 2016, and joined Le Mans' coaching staff.
