= Anthony Vosalho =

French footballer (born 1975)

Personal information
- Date of birth: 14 January 1975 (age 51)
- Place of birth: Saint-Geniès-de-Malgoirès, France
- Height: 1.80 m (5 ft 11 in)
- Position: Defender

Senior career*
Years	Team	Apps	(Gls)
1994–2002	Nîmes	216	(25)
2002–2005	Racing Ferrol	89	(6)
2005–2010	Dijon	48	(5)
Total		353	(36)
- * Club domestic league appearances and goals

Anthony Vosalho (born 14 January 1975) is a French former professional footballer who played as a defender.

Vosalho spent most of his career playing for Nîmes, helping the club reach the 1996 Coupe de France final. The following season, he starred as the club participated in the 1996–97 UEFA Cup Winners' Cup and won promotion to Ligue 2.

Vosalho joined Segunda División side Racing Ferrol for the 2002–03 season. The club was relegated, and Vosalho nearly left because the club couldn't afford his wages. However, he stayed on and helped Racing de Ferrol make an immediate return to the Segunda División.
