= Abdeslam Akouzar =

Moroccan footballer (born 1982)

Personal information
- Full name: Abdeslam Akouzar
- Date of birth: 15 April 1982 (age 44)
- Place of birth: Agadir, Morocco
- Height: 1.75 m (5 ft 9 in)
- Position: Left midfielder

Senior career*
Years	Team	Apps	(Gls)
2005–2006	Wasquehal	16	(2)
2006–2007	Beauvais	17	(6)
2007–2008	Reims	23	(1)
2008–2009	Gueugnon	37	(6)
2009–2011	Troyes	32	(3)
2011–2012	Orléans	27	(2)
- * Club domestic league appearances and goals as of 18:02, 20 July 2012 (UTC)

Abdeslam Akouzar (born 15 April 1982) is a Moroccan former footballer who played as a midfielder.

He signed for Troyes from FC Gueugnon on 20 July 2009.

Akouzar holds both Moroccan and French nationalities.
