= Marco Randriana =

Footballer (born 1983)

Personal information
- Full name: Marco Randrianantoanina
- Date of birth: 24 August 1983 (age 43)
- Place of birth: Bourg-la-Reine, France
- Height: 1.74 m (5 ft 9 in)
- Positions: Left-back; left midfielder

Senior career*
Years	Team	Apps	(Gls)
2001–2002	Birmingham City	0	(0)
2002–2003	Sedan B	29	(0)
2003–2006	Sedan	17	(0)
2004–2005	→ Gueugnon (loan)	3	(0)
2006–2007	Brest	30	(0)
2007–2008	Chamois Niortais	11	(0)
Total		90	(0)

International career
2007	Madagascar	1	(0)
- * Club domestic league appearances and goals

Marco Randrianantoanina (born 24 August 1983) is a footballer who played as a left-back or left midfielder. Born in France, he made one appearance for the Madagascar national team. His brother Claudio is also a footballer.

== Heart attack ==
On 18 January 2008, Randriana collapsed after suffering from a heart attack during Chamois Niortais' match against Sedan. He lost consciousness and was treated on the pitch with a defibrillator. He was transferred to hospital where his condition improved.

== Post-playing life ==
Randriana retired from playing football aged 24. He worked as a real estate agent for two years and set up a business for passenger transport.
