= Benoît Haaby =

French footballer (born 1982)

Personal information
- Date of birth: 4 January 1982 (age 44)
- Place of birth: Saint-Louis, France
- Height: 1.84 m (6 ft 0 in)
- Position: Defender

Senior career*
Years	Team	Apps	(Gls)
2003–2004	Sochaux	0	(0)
2004–2006	Gazélec Ajaccio	60	(3)
2006–2008	Clermont	54	(2)
2008–2010	Amiens	69	(1)
2010–2014	SR Colmar	96	(4)
2014–2016	Mulhouse	33	(1)
2016	ASC Biesheim	11	(0)
Total		323	(11)
- * Club domestic league appearances and goals

Benoît Haaby (born 4 January 1982) is a French former professional footballer who played as a defender.

Haaby has played in Ligue 2 for Clermont Foot and Amiens SC. (Note: Benoît Haaby – French league stats at LFP – also available in French (archived))
