= Maxime Ras =

French footballer (born 1988)

Personal information
- Date of birth: 14 July 1988 (age 38)
- Place of birth: Chambray-lès-Tours, France
- Height: 1.76 m (5 ft 9 in)
- Position: Forward

Team information
- Current team: Union Saint-Jean

Senior career*
Years	Team	Apps	(Gls)
2007–2009	Niort	14	(1)
2009–2011	Raon-l'Étape	52	(10)
2011–2012	Les Herbiers	27	(0)
2012–2014	Villefranche	58	(26)
2014–2015	Moulins	29	(13)
2015–2016	Mulhouse	27	(5)
2016–2018	Rodez AF	59	(16)
2018–2020	Créteil	29	(5)
2020–2021	Schiltigheim	6	(1)
2021–2022	Haguenau	8	(2)
2022–	Union Saint-Jean	5	(0)
- * Club domestic league appearances and goals as of 20 November 2021

Maxime Ras (born 14 July 1988) is a French footballer who plays as a striker for Union Saint-Jean.

== Career ==
Ras started his career with Chamois Niortais and made his debut for the club in the 0–0 Ligue 2 draw with Troyes on 18 April 2008, coming on as an injury-time substitute for Ronan Biger. Following Niort's relegation to the Championnat National for the 2008–09 season, Ras made a further 13 league appearances, scoring his first goal for the team in the 2–4 defeat away at Arles-Avignon on 10 April 2009. In the summer of 2009, he left Niort to join US Raon-l'Étape.

Ras spent two seasons with Raon-l'Étape, scoring 10 goals in 52 league matches for the club. He went on to join Les Herbiers in the summer of 2011. Although he made 25 first-team appearances for Les Herbiers, he was released by the club at the end of the 2011–12 season.

Ras stayed in Championnat de France Amateur for two seasons with FC Villefranche, one season with AS Moulins, and one season with FC Mulhouse before signing for Rodez AF on 6 July 2016, where he helped the team win promotion to Championnat National scoring 10 goals in 29 games.

He signed a contract with US Créteil-Lusitanos in June 2018.
