= Jérôme Martin =

French footballer (born 1986)

Personal information
- Date of birth: 1 June 1986 (age 40)
- Place of birth: Bordeaux, France
- Height: 1.74 m (5 ft 9 in)
- Position: Right back

Senior career*
Years	Team	Apps	(Gls)
2006–2007	Châteauroux	0	(0)
2007–2010	Libourne	50	(8)
2010–2011	Dijon	4	(0)
2011–2012	Orléans	19	(0)
2013	Stade Bordelais	7	(2)
2014	Tarbes	5	(0)
2015	Le Mont	9	(1)
Total		94	(11)
- * Club domestic league appearances and goals

Jérôme Martin (born 1 June 1986) is a French former professional footballer who played as a right-back.
