= Thierry Argelier =

French professional football player (born 1986)

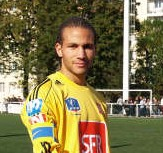

Personal information
- Date of birth: 8 July 1986 (age 40)
- Place of birth: Paris, France
- Height: 1.83 m (6 ft 0 in)
- Position: Defender

Team information
- Current team: Colomiers

Senior career*
Years	Team	Apps	(Gls)
2006–2009	Créteil	92	(4)
2009–2014	Guingamp	52	(2)
2013–2014	→ Vannes (loan)	18	(3)
2014–2015	Le Poiré-sur-Vie	18	(1)
2015–2019	Boulogne	103	(15)
2019–	Colomiers	0	(0)
- * Club domestic league appearances and goals as of 22:41, 18 July 2019 (UTC)

Thierry Argelier (born 8 July 1986) is a French professional football player. Currently he plays for US Colomiers.

== Career ==
Argelier joined US Colomiers ahead of the 2019/20 season.
