= Mohamed Louhkiar =

French footballer (born 1983)

Personal information
- Date of birth: 1 December 1983 (age 42)
- Place of birth: Besançon, France
- Height: 1.80 m (5 ft 11 in)
- Position: Midfielder

Team information
- Current team: Besançon RC

Senior career*
Years	Team	Apps	(Gls)
2004–2005	Besançon RC		
2005–2008	FC Gueugnon	55	(7)
2008–	Besançon RC		
- * Club domestic league appearances and goals as of 15:37, 23 November 2009 (UTC)

Mohamed Louhkiar (born 1 December 1983) is a French former professional footballer who played professionally in Ligue 2 for Gueugnon and also played for Championnat de France amateur club Besançon.
