= Lionel Gautherie =

- Born: 5 July 1982 (age 44)
- Height: 1.85 m (6 ft 1 in)
- Weight: 93 kg (14.6 st)

Rugby union career
- Position: Wing
Senior career
Years	Team	Apps	(Points)
2008–2009	Lyon OU		
2009–present	Pays d'Aix	22	(0)

Lionel Gautherie (born 5 July 1982) is a former Stade Français rugby player who currently plays for Lyon OU. His usual position is at Wing.

== Career ==
Gautherie subsequently played as winger for the PARC (Pays d'Aix RC Rugby Club). He currently plays for LOU Rugby in Lyon. He is one of the first French rugbymen to appear fully nude in the Dieux du Stade calendar, repeatedly showing full frontal nudity in the 2004, 2005 and 2007 editions. Along with Morgan Souply and Thomas Mège, he was chosen to promote the 2004 calendar in the media. In January 2007, Gautherie played number 11 in France Amateur – a team chosen from the Federale Divisions which are "amateur" – and beat Spain 47–0 at Aire Sur L'Adour in France.

He now plays for Aix-en-Provence again.
