= Rolamellah Nouar =

Algerian footballer (born 1982)

Personal information
- Full name: Rolamellah Nouar
- Date of birth: 27 June 1982 (age 44)
- Place of birth: Miramas, France
- Height: 1.70 m (5 ft 7 in)
- Position: Striker

Team information
- Current team: US Le Pontet

Youth career
- 1992–1995: Arles-Avignon
- 1995–2001: Nîmes

Senior career*
Years	Team	Apps	(Gls)
2001–2003	Beaucaire	7	(0)
2003–2005	Castelnau Le Crès		
2005–2006	Montluçon	28	(10)
2006–2007	Agde	28	(15)
2007–2008	Sète	34	(10)
2008–2009	Laval	36	(7)
2009–2010	Amiens	15	(4)
2010–2011	Orléans	23	(6)
2011–2012	Gap	9	(2)
2012	Jura Sud	18	(9)
2012–2013	US Marignane	29	(16)
2013–2014	US Le Pontet	24	(9)
2014–2016	FC Martigues	44	(15)
2016–	US Le Pontet	9	(1)

International career
2001–2002	Algeria U20		
- * Club domestic league appearances and goals as of 20 July 2017 (UTC)

Rolamellah Nouar (born 27 June 1982) is a footballer who currently plays for French club US Le Pontet. He previously had stints with professional clubs Stade Lavallois and Amiens SC and has spent his entire career playing in the French amateur divisions. Born in France, he has represented Algeria at youth level.
