= Christophe Coué =

French footballer (born 1982)

Personal information
- Full name: Christophe Coué
- Date of birth: March 23, 1982 (age 44)
- Place of birth: Malestroit, France
- Height: 1.83 m (6 ft 0 in)
- Position: Defender

Team information
- Current team: Vannes
- Number: 2

Youth career
- 2000–2003: Lorient

Senior career*
Years	Team	Apps	(Gls)
2003–2006	Lorient	21	(0)
2006–2009	Clermont	92	(1)
2009–2011	Laval	45	(0)
2011–2013	Fréjus Saint-Raphaël	19	(0)
2013–	Vannes	55	(2)
- * Club domestic league appearances and goals as of 22:06, 14 November 2017 (UTC)

Christophe Coué (born March 23, 1982) is a France football defender, who is currently contracted with Vannes OC.

== Career ==
He has played for FC Lorient and Clermont Foot. On 1 July 2009 Stade Lavallois signed the left-back from Clermont Foot.
