= Fabien Lavoyer =

French footballer (born 1985)

Personal information
- Full name: Fabien Lavoyer
- Date of birth: 29 July 1985 (age 41)
- Place of birth: Dijon, France
- Height: 1.84 m (6 ft 0 in)
- Position: Midfielder

Team information
- Current team: Luçon

Senior career*
Years	Team	Apps	(Gls)
2003–2005	Sochaux B	22	(1)
2005–2006	SO Romorantin	15	(0)
2006–2008	US Creteil-Lusitanos	59	(1)
2008–2009	Chamois Niortais	25	(1)
2010–	Luçon	10	(0)
- * Club domestic league appearances and goals as of 18:28, 1 May 2010 (UTC)

Fabien Lavoyer (born 29 July 1985) is a French midfielder currently playing for Championnat de France amateur side Luçon.
