= Dimitri Durand =

French football striker (born 1982)

Personal information
- Full name: Dimitri Durand
- Date of birth: April 2, 1982 (age 44)
- Place of birth: Champigny-sur-Marne, France
- Height: 1.81 m (5 ft 11 in)
- Position: Striker

Senior career*
Years	Team	Apps	(Gls)
2003–2005	Créteil	13	(0)
2005–2008	Villemomble	85	(17)
2008–2009	Cherbourg	37	(7)
2009–2010	Red Star		
2011	Lokomotiv Plovdiv	0	(0)
2011	Aubervilliers	2	(0)
2014	US Créteil B		
2014	Villemomble Sports	5	(0)
- * Club domestic league appearances and goals

Dimitri Durand (born April 2, 1982) is a French former professional footballer who played as a striker.
