= Kévin Jacmot =

French footballer (born 1984)

Personal information
- Date of birth: 22 March 1984 (age 42)
- Place of birth: Lyon, France
- Height: 1.71 m (5 ft 7 in)
- Position: Midfielder

Senior career*
Years	Team	Apps	(Gls)
2002–2005	Lyon	0	(0)
2003–2004	→ Bastia (loan)	4	(0)
2005–2006	Lyon Duchère	14	(1)
2006–2008	Saint-Priest		
2008–2010	Virton	41	(1)
2010–2011	Gap FC	16	(1)

International career
- France U17
- * Club domestic league appearances and goals

Kévin Jacmot (born 22 March 1984) is a French former professional footballer who played as a midfielder.

== Career ==
Born in Lyon, France, Jacmot started his career at Lyon in 2002, and was sent away on loan to Bastia the following season. He then moved to Championnat de France Amateur club Lyon Duchère. In March 2006 his club was unable to reach him and it was reported that he would retire.

However, after a season at Lyon Duchère, he moved to Saint-Priest.

Jacmot played for Championnat National side Gap in the 2010–11 season.

Jacmot was a member of the France U-17 national team and played for them at the 2001 FIFA U-17 World Championship which the team won.
