= Mamadou Camara (footballer, born 1988) =

French footballer

Personal information
- Date of birth: 6 April 1988 (age 38)
- Place of birth: Niort, France
- Height: 1.80 m (5 ft 11 in)
- Position: Centre-back

Youth career
- 1999–2008: Chamois Niortais

Senior career*
Years	Team	Apps	(Gls)
2008–2011	Chamois Niortais	88	(4)
2011–2013	Guingamp	19	(0)
2012–2013	Guingamp B	6	(0)
2013–2014	CA Bastia	29	(1)
2014–2015	Strasbourg	9	(0)
2015–2016	Fontenay	19	(1)
2016–2018	Boulogne	37	(0)
2018–2019	Lyon-Duchère	37	(2)
2019–2020	Bourg-en-Bresse	17	(0)
2020–2022	Le Puy	20	(0)
2022–2023	ES La Rochelle	0	(0)
- * Club domestic league appearances and goals

Mamadou Camara (born 6 April 1988) is a French former professional footballer who played as a centre-back.

== Career ==
Camara started his career with Chamois Niortais, and was brought into the Niort team at the start of the 2008–09 season. He went on to play over 30 times in his first campaign, including one appearance in the Coupe de la Ligue, when Niort lost 2–1 to Créteil. On 26 July 2009, it was announced that despite Niort's relegation from the Championnat National, Camara had signed a contract to keep him at the club until the summer of 2010. On 23 January 2010, he scored his first league goal in the 1–1 draw with Albi at the Stade René Gaillard.

In August 2014, Camara signed a one-year contract with Strasbourg.

In June 2019, Camara joined Bourg-en-Bresse.

== Personal life ==
Born in France, Camara is of Senegalese descent.

== Career statistics ==
Appearances and goals by club, season and competition
Club	Season	League			National cup		League cup		Total	
Club	Season	Division	Apps	Goals	Apps	Goals	Apps	Goals	Apps	Goals
Chamois Niortais	2008–09	National	29	0	1	0	5	0	35	0
Chamois Niortais	2009–10	CFA	25	2	4	1	—		29	3
Chamois Niortais	2010–11	National	34	2			—		34	2
Chamois Niortais	Total		88	4	5	1	5	0	98	5
Guingamp	2011–12	Ligue 2	13	0	1	0	1	0	15	0
Guingamp	2012–13	Ligue 2	6	0	0	0	1	0	7	0
Guingamp	Total		19	0	1	0	2	0	22	0
Guingamp B	2012–13	CFA 2	6	0	—		—		6	0
CA Bastia	2013–14	Ligue 2	29	1	3	1	1	0	33	2
Strasbourg	2014–15	National	9	0	1	0	—		10	0
Fontenay	2015–16	CFA	19	1	0	0	—		19	1
Boulogne	2016–17	National	27	0	0	0	—		27	0
Boulogne	2017–18	National	10	0	2	0	—		12	0
Boulogne	Total		37	0	2	0	—		39	0
Lyon-Duchère	2017–18	National	12	1	0	0	—		12	1
Lyon-Duchère	2018–19	National	25	1	3	0	—		28	1
Lyon-Duchère	Total		37	1	3	0	—		40	2
Bourg-en-Bresse	2019–20	National	17	0	2	0	1	0	20	0
Le Puy	2020–21	National 2	7	0	5	0	—		12	0
Le Puy	2021–22	National 2	13	0	0	0	—		13	0
Le Puy	Total		20	0	5	0	—		25	0
Career total			281	8	22	2	9	0	312	10

== Honours ==
Le Puy

- Championnat National 2: 2021–22
