= Cédric De La Loma =

French footballer (born 1984)

Personal information
- Date of birth: 14 April 1984 (age 42)
- Place of birth: Toulouse, France
- Height: 1.74 m (5 ft 9 in)
- Position: Midfielder

Senior career*
Years	Team	Apps	(Gls)
2003–2005	Monaco B	52	(5)
2005–2008	Croix de Savoie	39	(0)
2008–2009	Cassis Carnoux	33	(2)
2009–2010	Meyrin		
2010–2012	Stade Nyonnais	41	(4)
- * Club domestic league appearances and goals

Cédric De La Loma (born 14 April 1984) is a French former professional footballer who played as a midfielder.

== Career ==
Born in Toulouse, he began his career with Monaco, where he made 52 appearances in the Championnat de France amateur (CFA) for the reserve team. In 2005, De La Loma joined Championnat National side Croix de Savoie. He played 26 league matches during the 2005–06 season as the club finished 18th in the division and was consequently relegated to the CFA. Over the next two seasons he played a total of 13 games before returning to the Championnat National with newly promoted Cassis Carnoux in the summer of 2008. De La Loma scored on his debut for Cassis Carnoux, netting the winning goal in the 1–0 win over Entente SSG on 2 August 2008. He went on to make 33 league appearances for the club, scoring twice.

In 2009, De La Loma moved to Switzerland to sign for FC Meyrin. The following year, he joined Swiss Challenge League side Stade Nyonnais and played 40 matches for the club over the next two seasons. He was part of the Stade Nyonnais team that was relegated from the Challenge League at the end of the 2011–12 campaign.
