= Madjid Bouabdellah =

Algerian football player (born 1981)

Personal information
- Date of birth: October 30, 1981 (age 44)
- Place of birth: Ivry-sur-Seine, France
- Height: 1.80 m (5 ft 11 in)
- Position: Striker

Team information
- Current team: MC Alger

Senior career*
Years	Team	Apps	(Gls)
2002–2005	Pau FC	61	(12)
2005–2006	FC Sete	5	(0)
2006–2006	AS Cannes	10	(0)
2006–2007	Paris FC	18	(1)
2007–2008	Pau FC	20	(10)
2008–2009	US Creteil	30	(7)
2009–	MC Alger	0	(0)
- * Club domestic league appearances and goals as of July 2, 2009

Madjid Bouabdellah (born October 30, 1981, in Ivry-sur-Seine, France) is an Algerian football player who is currently playing as a forward for MC Alger in the Algerian Championnat National.
