= Malik Couturier =

French football defender (born 1982)

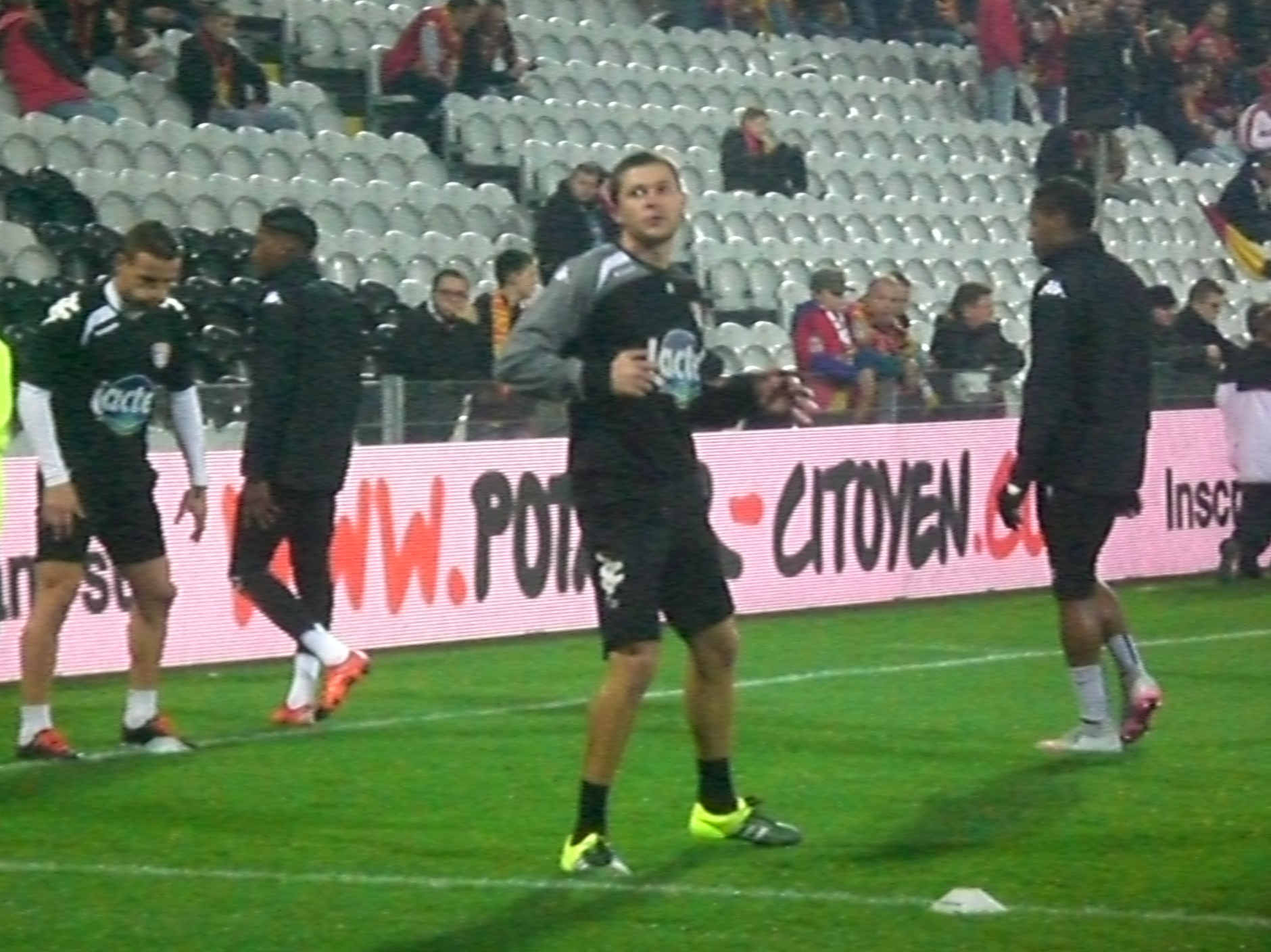

Personal information
- Full name: Malik Couturier
- Date of birth: 21 January 1982 (age 44)
- Place of birth: Jonzac, France
- Height: 6 ft 1 in (1.85 m)
- Position: Center back

Senior career*
Years	Team	Apps	(Gls)
2002–2008	Chamois Niortais	140	(5)
2008–2013	Angers	146	(7)
2012	Angers B	3	(1)
2013–2017	Laval	92	(3)
2014–2015	Laval B	2	(1)
- * Club domestic league appearances and goals as of 12 July 2017 (UTC)

Malik Couturier (born 21 January 1982) is a French football defender.

Couturier previously played for Niort and Angers in Ligue 2. (Note: Malik Couturier – French league stats at LFP – also available in French (archived))

== Honours ==
Chamois Niortais

- Championnat National champions: 2005–06
