= Johann Chapuis =

French footballer (born 1975)

Personal information
- Full name: Johann Chapuis
- Date of birth: 15 January 1975 (age 51)
- Place of birth: Besançon, France
- Height: 1.85 m (6 ft 1 in)
- Position: Defender

Senior career*
Years	Team	Apps	(Gls)
1997–2000	Besançon	83	(13)
2000–2001	Nancy	10	(1)
2001–2003	Louhans-Cuiseaux	64	(6)
2003–2004	Rouen	29	(0)
2004–2005	Valence	34	(3)
2005–2008	Chamois Niortais	98	(14)
2008–2011	Laval	110	(15)
2011–2012	Créteil	22	(0)
2012–2014	Jura Sud	44	(3)
- * Club domestic league appearances and goals

Johann Chapuis (born 15 January 1975) is a retired French footballer who played as a defender.

== Career ==
Chapuis made 177 appearances in Ligue 2, and he helped three clubs gain promotion from the Championnat National to Ligue 2. His previous clubs include AS Nancy Lorraine, Louhans-Cuiseaux, FC Rouen and Stade Lavallois.

== Honours ==
Chamois Niortais

- Championnat National champions: 2005–06
