= Kévin Aubeneau =

French footballer (born 1989)

Personal information
- Full name: Kévin Aubeneau
- Date of birth: 10 February 1989 (age 37)
- Place of birth: Niort, France
- Height: 6 ft 1 in (1.85 m)
- Position: Goalkeeper

Team information
- Current team: Vitré

Youth career
- 2005–2007: Chamois Niortais

Senior career*
| Years | Team | Apps | (Gls) |
| 2007–2011 | Niort | 87 | (0) |
| 2011–2012 | Laval | 0 | (0) |
| 2012–2016 | Les Herbiers | 103 | (0) |
| 2016– | Vitré | 29 | (0) |
- * Club domestic league appearances and goals as of 15:26, 24 June 2017 (UTC)

Kévin Aubeneau (born 10 February 1989) is a goalkeeper currently playing for Championnat de France amateur side Vitré and Etrelles. Between 2007 and 2011 he played for his hometown club Chamois Niortais, where he made 87 league appearances. Aubeneau made his league debut for Niort in the 2–1 victory over US Boulogne in Ligue 2 on 27 July 2007. On 2 June 2011, he joined Ligue 2 club Laval. However, Aubeneau failed to break into the first team at Laval and made only one appearance for the reserve team, and subsequently joined CFA side Les Herbiers on 16 June 2012.
