= Nicolas de Géa =

French footballer (born 1983)

Personal information
- Full name: Nicolas de Géa
- Date of birth: 24 February 1983 (age 43)
- Place of birth: Talence, France
- Height: 1.86 m (6 ft 1 in)
- Position: Attacking midfielder

Team information
- Current team: Stade Bordelais

Senior career*
Years	Team	Apps	(Gls)
1999–2000	Stade Bordelais	?	(?)
2000–2001	Mérignac	?	(?)
2001–2003	Blanquefort	?	(?)
2003–2004	Trélissac	29	(3)
2004–2005	Libourne	0	(0)
2005	→ Mérignac (loan)	?	(?)
2005–2006	Arcachon	25	(2)
2006	Strasbourg	2	(0)
2006–2007	Nîmes	12	(5)
2007–2008	Beauvais	30	(5)
2008–2009	Chamois Niortais	20	(2)
2010–2017	Stade Bordelais	22	(3)
2017-	escadron 26/1 cuistot d'exception		
- * Club domestic league appearances and goals as of 19:12, 30 January 2012 (UTC)

Nicolas de Géa (born 24 February 1983) is a French attacking midfielder who has played for Stade Bordelais since 2010. He previously played in Ligue 2 with RC Strasbourg, and had spells in the Championnat National with AS Beauvais Oise, Nîmes Olympique and Chamois Niortais. He has played a five with Zizou and Dugarry and a croisé Mathieu Bodmer one time.
