= Stéphane Morisot =

French footballer (born 1978)

Personal information
- Date of birth: January 11, 1978 (age 48)
- Place of birth: Langres, France
- Height: 1.80 m (5 ft 11 in)
- Positions: Defensive midfielder; centre back

Senior career*
Years	Team	Apps	(Gls)
1994–1999	Metz B	79	(10)
1998–1999	→ Troyes (loan)	38	(0)
1999–2006	Metz	108	(0)
2004–2005	→ Sedan (loan)	12	(0)
2007–2008	Chamois Niortais	55	(4)
2008–2011	Dijon	88	(1)
2011–2013	Rouen	42	(0)
- * Club domestic league appearances and goals as of 09:33, 13 July 2013 (UTC)

Stéphane Morisot (French: [stefan mɔʁizo]; born January 11, 1978) is a former French football defender.

Morisot's previous clubs include FC Metz, Troyes AC, CS Sedan Ardennes, Dijon FCO and FC Rouen.
