= David Leray =

French footballer (born 1984)

Personal information
- Date of birth: 2 March 1984 (age 42)
- Place of birth: Saint-Père-en-Retz, France
- Height: 1.81 m (5 ft 11 in)
- Position: Defender

Youth career
- St Pierre de Retz
- L'Eclair De Chauve
- 2001–2004: Nantes

Senior career*
Years	Team	Apps	(Gls)
2004–2006	Nantes	27	(0)
2006–2007	Tours	31	(0)
2007–2011	Angers	72	(2)
2011–2012	ASR Machecoul		
2012–2013	Cholet		
- * Club domestic league appearances and goals

David Leray (born 2 March 1984 in Saint-Père-en-Retz) (Note: David Leray – French league stats at LFP – also available in French (archived)) is a French former professional footballer who played as a defender for St Pierre de Retz Sporting, L'Eclair De Chauve in the youth side and professionally for Nantes, Tours, Angers, ASR Machecoul, and Cholet.
