= Laurent Gagnier =

French footballer (born 1979)

Personal information
- Full name: Laurent Gagnier
- Date of birth: 12 January 1979 (age 47)
- Place of birth: Antibes, France
- Height: 1.82 m (5 ft 11 1/2 in)
- Position: Striker

Senior career*
Years	Team	Apps	(Gls)
1999–2003	Nice	94	(19)
2002–2004	Niort	33	(14)
2004–2006	Sedan	53	(6)
2006–2008	Niort	38	(5)
2008–2009	Pachuca	24	(6)
2009–2010	Amiens	23	(4)
2011–2012	Red Star	17	(5)
- * Club domestic league appearances and goals as of 13:08, 9 April 2010 (UTC)

Laurent Gagnier (born 12 January 1979) is a former French football striker. He appeared in more than 300 professional matches for clubs including OGC Nice, Chamois Niortais FC, CS Sedan Ardennes, Amiens SC, and Red Star FC. Over the course of his career, he also played in Cyprus, Thailand, Iran, and China. After leaving Red Star in 2012, he concluded his football career in Gabon, where he lived for two years.
