= Romain Jacuzzi =

French footballer (born 1984)

Personal information
- Full name: Romain Jacuzzi
- Date of birth: 16 December 1984 (age 41)
- Place of birth: Mont-de-Marsan, France
- Height: 1.81 m (5 ft 11 1/2 in)
- Position: Striker

Team information
- Current team: Vendée Poiré sur Vie

Senior career*
Years	Team	Apps	(Gls)
2002–2009	Chamois Niortais	83	(19)
2006–2007	→ Vannes (loan)	27	(6)
2009–2011	Laval	18	(0)
2011–	Vendée Poiré sur Vie		
- * Club domestic league appearances and goals as of 15:11, 23 May 2009 (UTC)

Romain Jacuzzi (born 16 December 1984) is a retired striker who last played for French side FC Challans. According to Transfermarkt, Jacuzzi retired in 2015.

From 2002 to 2009, Jacuzzi played for Chamois Niortais, where he experienced one promotion and three relegations. During the 2006–2007 season, he had a loan spell at Championnat National side Vannes OC. On 1 July 2009 it was announced that Jacuzzi had signed a two-year contract with Laval.
