= Denis Tsoumou =

Congolese footballer

Personal information
- Full name: Denis Tsoumou
- Date of birth: 9 November 1978 (age 47)
- Place of birth: Brazzaville, Republic of the Congo
- Height: 1.76 m (5 ft 9 in)
- Position: Midfielder

Senior career*
Years	Team	Apps	(Gls)
1998–2002	Club 57 (Brazzaville)		
2002–2005	Saint-Priest	58	(4)
2005–2007	Gueugnon	67	(3)
2007–2009	Chamois Niortais	50	(0)

International career
1998–2008	Congo	26	(2)
- * Club domestic league appearances and goals

Denis Tsoumou (born 9 November 1978 in Brazzaville) is a Congolese former professional footballer who played as a midfielder. He played for French clubs Saint-Priest, Gueugnon, and Chamois Niortais. At international level, he won 26 caps for the Congo national team.
