= Romain Ferrier =

French footballer (born 1976)

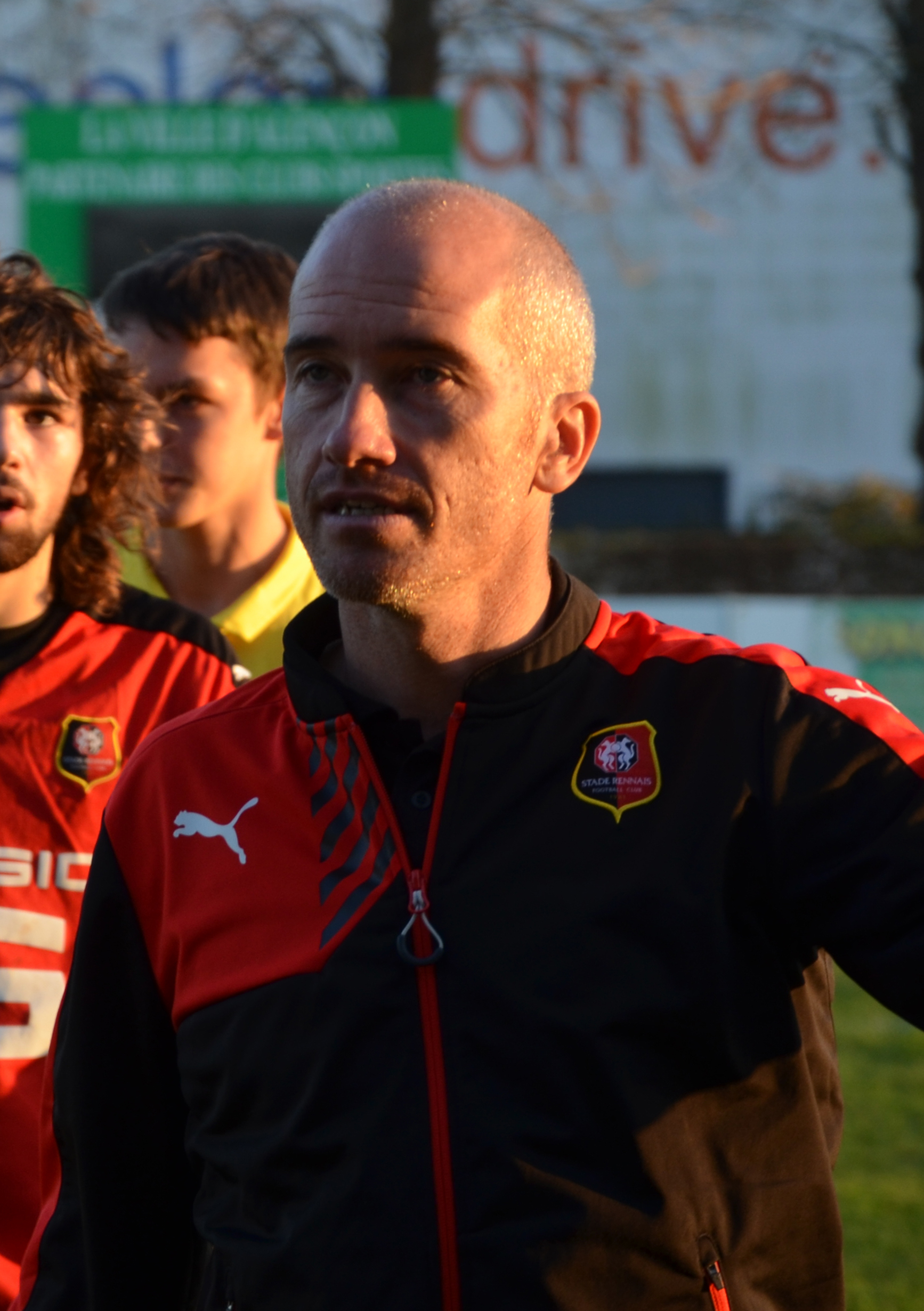
- Ferrier in November 2015

Personal information
- Full name: Romain Ferrier
- Date of birth: 24 February 1976 (age 50)
- Place of birth: Cannes, France
- Height: 1.80 m (5 ft 11 in)
- Position: Left back

Senior career*
| Years | Team | Apps | (Gls) |
| 1995–1997 | Cannes | 51 | (1) |
| 1997–1999 | Bordeaux | 42 | (0) |
| 1999–2000 | Montpellier | 17 | (0) |
| 2000–2004 | Guingamp | 93 | (1) |
| 2004–2005 | Ciudad de Murcia | 12 | (0) |
| 2005–2008 | Chamois Niortais | 109 | (2) |
| 2008–2009 | Skoda Xanthi | 12 | (0) |
- * Club domestic league appearances and goals

Romain Ferrier (born 24 February 1976) is a retired French footballer who played as a defender.

His previous clubs include AS Cannes, Bordeaux, Montpellier HSC and Guingamp. (Note: Romain Ferrier – French league stats at LFP – also available in French (archived)) He also played in Europe with Bordeaux and Montpellier and had a spell in Greece with Skoda Xanthi.

== Honours ==
Bordeaux

- Division 1 champions: 1998–99

Montpellier

- UEFA Intertoto Cup: 1999

Chamois Niortais

- Championnat National champions: 2005–06
