= Robin Desserne =

French footballer (born 1984)

Personal information
- Full name: Robin Georges Sauveur Desserne
- Date of birth: 1 March 1984 (age 42)
- Place of birth: Nice, France
- Height: 1.92 m (6 ft 4 in)
- Position: Defender

Senior career*
Years	Team	Apps	(Gls)
2001–2004	Nice B	29	(0)
2004–2007	Málaga B	24	(0)
2005–2006	→ Sabadell (loan)	13	(0)
2007–2008	Lleida	34	(3)
2008–2009	Chamois Niortais	14	(1)
Total		114	(4)
- * Club domestic league appearances and goals

Robin Georges Sauveur Desserne (born 1 March 1984) is a retired French footballer who played as a defender.
