= David Klein (footballer) =

French footballer (born 1973)

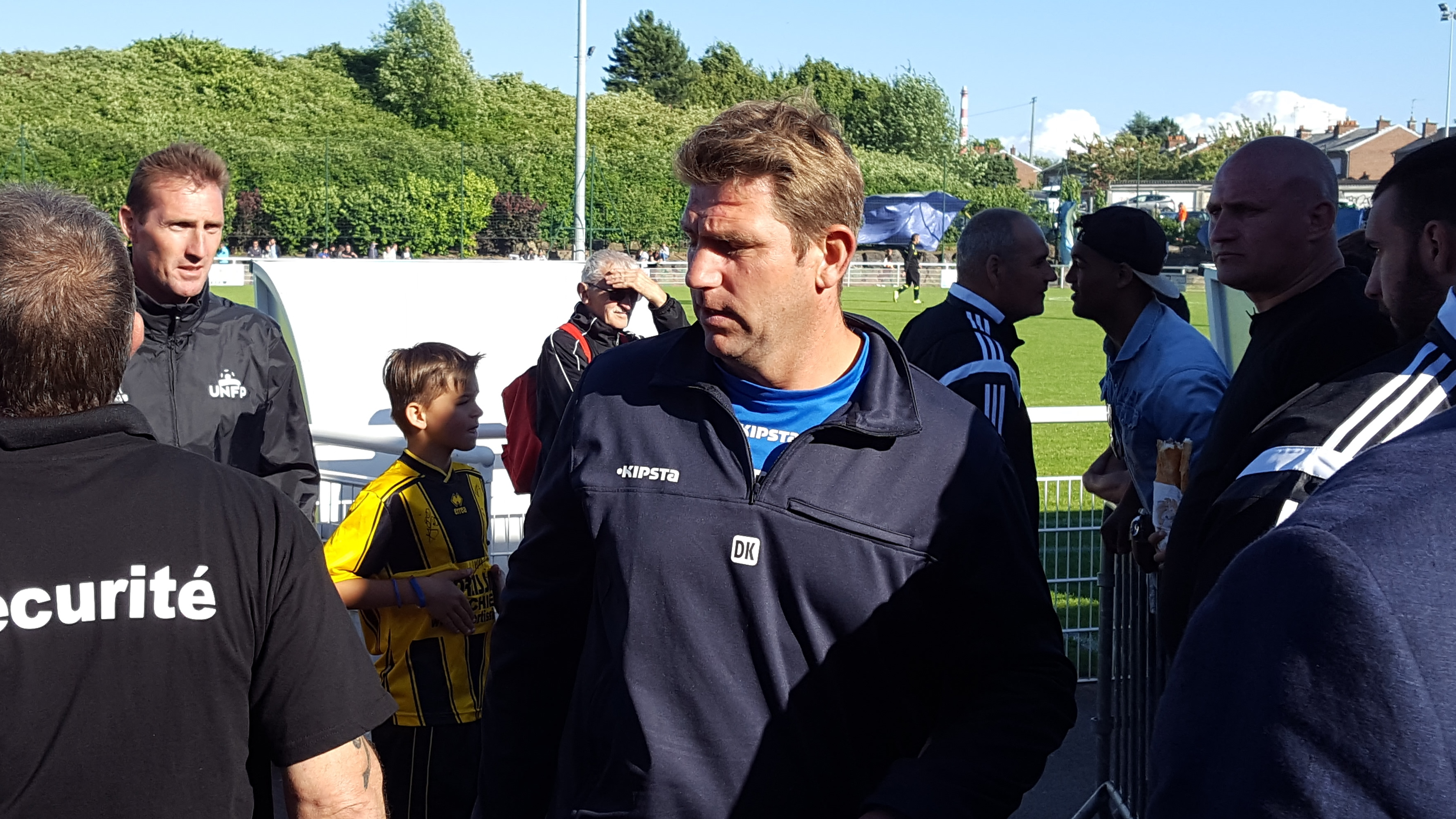

Personal information
- Full name: David Klein
- Date of birth: 13 August 1973 (age 53)
- Place of birth: Mulhouse, France
- Height: 1.85 m (6 ft 1 in)
- Position: Goalkeeper

Team information
- Current team: Auxerre B (gk coach)

Senior career*
Years	Team	Apps	(Gls)
1995–1998	Strasbourg	8	(0)
1998	Toulouse	0	(0)
1998–2000	Ajaccio	62	(0)
2000–2001	Metz	2	(0)
2001	Clydebank	1	(0)
2001	Partick Thistle	5	(0)
2001	Martigues	9	(0)
2001–2002	Clermont Foot	2	(0)
2002–2003	Martigues	37	(0)
2003	La Roche-sur-Yon	3	(0)
2003–2006	Valenciennes	102	(0)
2006–2007	Niort	48	(0)
2008–2009	RC Strasbourg	0	(0)

Managerial career
- 2009–2010: RC Strasbourg B (gk coach)
- 2010–2011: RC Strasbourg (gk coach)
- 2011–2014: Valenciennes B (gk coach)
- 2014–2017: Valenciennes (gk coach)
- 2018–2019: Mauritania (gk coach)
- 2019–: Auxerre B (gk coach)
- * Club domestic league appearances and goals

David Klein (born 13 August 1973) is a retired French goalkeeper and current goalkeeper coach of Auxerre's B-team.

== Career ==
After retiring at the end of the 2008-09 season, Klein started that same summer as goalkeeping coach for RC Strasbourg's B team. In the summer of 2010, he stepped up as goalkeeping coach of the club's first team squad, replacing Alexander Vencel (footballer, born 1967), under new manager Laurent Fournier.

In the summer of 2011 he was hired in the same position for Valenciennes' B team. Ahead of the 2014-15 season, Klein was promoted to the first team squad as goalkeeping coach under manager Faruk Hadžibegić's staff. In May 2017, it was confirmed that Klein's contract was not extended and he left the club.

Not long after leaving Valenciennes, Klein started his own goalkeeping academy. Among other things, Klein, under his own goalkeeping academy 'J4K Valenciennes', was responsible for goalkeeper training at the club La Sentinelle, which played in the Hauts-de-France league in France.

In the 2018-19 season, Klein was the goalkeeping coach for the Mauritania national football team ahead of the 2019 Africa Cup of Nations.

Ahead of the 2019-20 season, Klein was appointed goalkeeper coach of Auxerre's reserve team.
