= Jordan Chort =

French footballer (born 1987)

Personal information
- Full name: Jordan Chort
- Date of birth: March 6, 1987 (age 39)
- Place of birth: Bruges, France
- Height: 1.80 m (5 ft 11 in)
- Position: Full-back

Team information
- Current team: Aviron Bayonnais
- Number: 3

Senior career*
Years	Team	Apps	(Gls)
2006–2008	Chamois Niortais	2	(0)
2008–2009	Libourne	21	(0)
2009–2012	Aviron Bayonnais	55	(2)
2012–2018	Genêts Anglet	143	(13)
2018–	Aviron Bayonnais	20	(1)
- * Club domestic league appearances and goals as of 1 July 2019

Jordan Chort (born March 6, 1987) is a professional footballer who plays as a full-back for Aviron Bayonnais.

He signed for Bayonnais on a free transfer on July 16, 2009.
