= Jérôme Cellier =

French footballer (born 1984)

Personal information
- Date of birth: 8 February 1984 (age 42)
- Place of birth: Les Sables-d'Olonne, France
- Height: 1.82 m (6 ft 0 in)
- Position: Left back

Senior career*
Years	Team	Apps	(Gls)
2004–2007	Chamois Niortais	29	(0)
2007–2011	Clermont Foot	47	(0)
2011–2012	AS Beauvais	6	(0)
2013–2014	La Roche-sur-Yon	4	(0)
- * Club domestic league appearances and goals

Jérôme Cellier (born 8 February 1984) is a retired French footballer who played as a defender.

During his career, Cellier represented Chamois Niortais, Clermont Foot, Beauvais and La Roche-sur-Yon, making more than 50 appearances in Ligue 2.

== Honours ==
Chamois Niortais

- Championnat National champions: 2005–06
