= Ronan Biger =

French footballer (born 1985)

Personal information
- Full name: Ronan Biger
- Date of birth: 8 October 1985 (age 41)
- Place of birth: Paris, France
- Height: 5 ft 7 in (1.70 m)
- Position: Midfielder

Team information
- Current team: AS Échiré Saint Gelais

Senior career*
Years	Team	Apps	(Gls)
2004–2009	Chamois Niortais	115	(4)
2009–2010	Moulins	24	(4)
2010–2011	Les Herbiers	18	(2)
2011–2013	Andrézieux	33	(6)
2013–2017	Vitré	67	(14)
2017–	AS Échiré Saint Gelais		

International career
2011	Brittany	1	(0)
- * Club domestic league appearances and goals as of 12:59, 30 May 2015 (UTC)

Ronan Biger (born 8 October 1985) is a French footballer who plays as a midfielder for AS Échiré Saint Gelais.

== Honours ==
Chamois Niortais

- Championnat National champions: 2005–06
