= Benoît Leroy =

French footballer (born 1982)

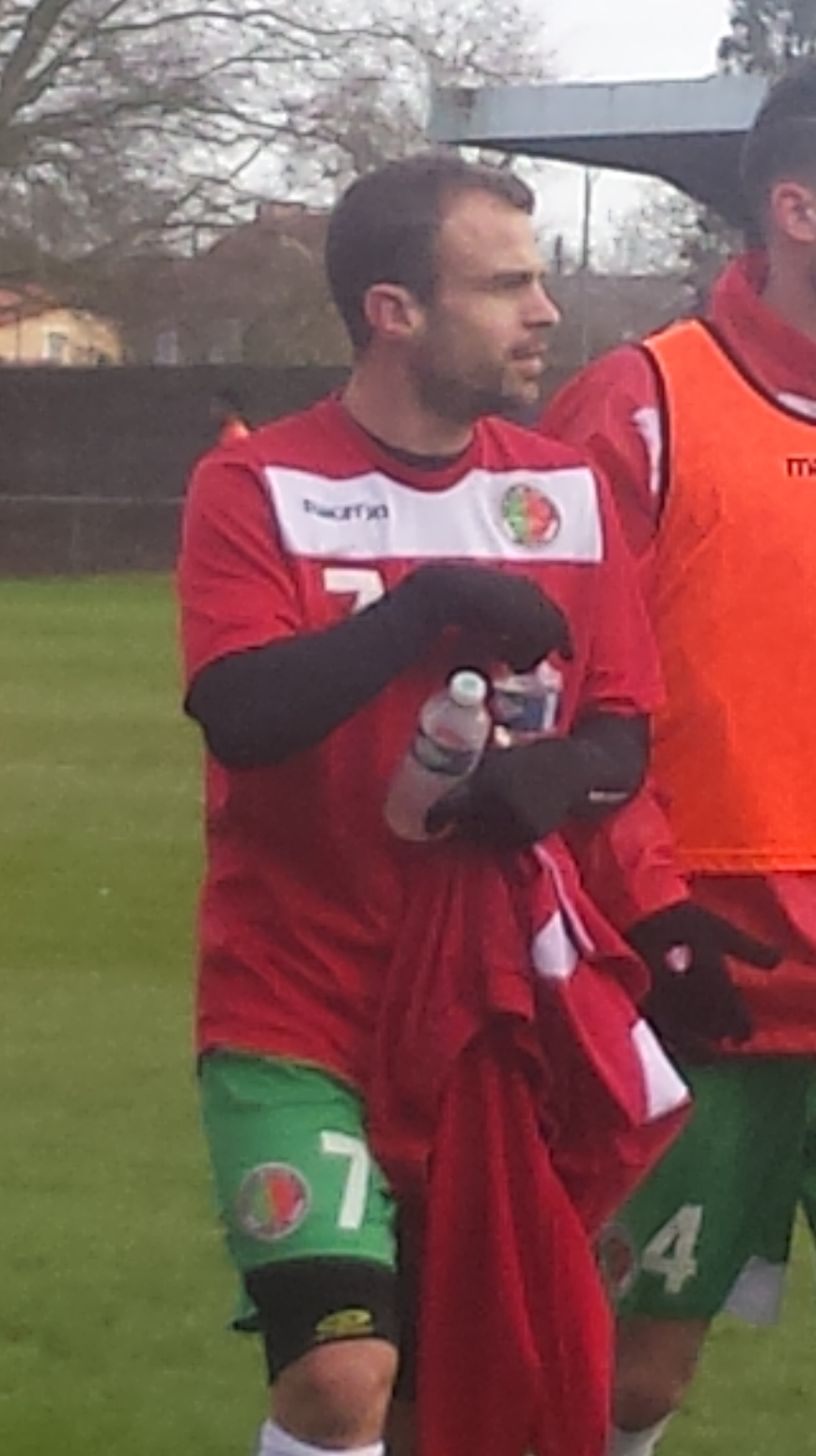
- Leroy in 2015

Personal information
- Date of birth: 28 July 1982 (age 44)
- Place of birth: Châteauroux, France
- Height: 1.72 m (5 ft 8 in)
- Position: Striker

Youth career
- 1999–2004: Auxerre

Senior career*
Years	Team	Apps	(Gls)
2004–2005	Besançon	36	(11)
2005–2008	Niort	88	(27)
2008–2010	Brest	28	(1)
2010–2013	Cannes	95	(23)
2013–2014	Hyères	25	(10)
2014–2017	Sedan	84	(13)
- * Club domestic league appearances and goals

Benoît Leroy (born 28 July 1982) is a retired French football midfielder.

== Career ==
Leroy previously played for Championnat de France Amateurs side Racing Besançon and Ligue 2 side Niort, where he made his full professional debut in August 2006 in a 2–1 victory in which he scored the second goal.
