= Vincent Durand =

French football midfielder (born 1984)

Personal information
- Date of birth: 17 May 1984 (age 42)
- Place of birth: Niort, France
- Height: 1.75 m (5 ft 9 in)
- Position: Midfielder

Senior career*
Years	Team	Apps	(Gls)
2004–2007	Chamois Niortais	48	(0)
2008	Martigues	14	(1)
2008–2009	Paris FC	25	(0)
2009–2013	Chamois Niortais	100	(2)
2013–2014	Carquefou	30	(0)
2014–2016	Sedan	39	(0)
2016–2017	Saint-Liguaire Niort		
- * Club domestic league appearances and goals

Vincent Durand (born 17 May 1984) is a French former football midfielder.

== Career ==
In July 2007, Durand left then Ligue 2 side Chamois Niortais after playing with them for three seasons and subsequently joined FC Martigues in January 2008. He played for Martigues for just five months before transferring to Paris FC in the summer of 2008. On 30 June 2009, Durand returned to his recently relegated hometown club, Chamois Niortais.

== Honours ==
Chamois Niortais

- Championnat National champions: 2005–06
- Championnat de France amateur Group C winners: 2009–10
