= 2007–08 Amiens SC season =

Amiens SC
2007–08 season
- Chairman: Pascal Pouillet
- Manager: Ludovic Batelli
- Stadium: Stade de la Licorne
- Ligue 2: 14th
- Coupe de la Ligue: Round of 16
- Coupe de France: Semi final
- Top goalscorer: League: Titi Buengo (14); All: Titi Buengo (17)
Home colours	Away colours

The 2007–08 season saw Amiens SC's compete in Ligue 2 where they finished in 14th position with 45 points.

== Results ==
=== Legend ===
Win	Draw	Loss

=== Ligue 2 ===
Match	Date	Opponent	Venue	Result	Attendance	Scorers
1	27 July 2007	Gueugnon	A	2–1	2,910	Buron 4', Buengo 90'
2	6 August 2007	Troyes	H	0–0	10,306	
3	10 August 2007	Dijon	A	0–1	4,333	
4	17 August 2007	Grenoble	H	1–2	9,144	Raynier 2'
5	24 August 2007	Guingamp	A	0–1	9,110	
6	31 August 2007	Chamois Niortais	H	0–2	8,164	
7	14 September 2007	Ajaccio	A	0–1	2,024	
8	21 September 2007	Boulogne	H	2–1	8,968	Rabihou 20', Buron 45'
9	29 September 2007	Angers	A	0–2	5,552	
10	2 October 2007	Montpellier	H	1–1	8,998	Vairelles 90+4'
11	5 October 2007	Sedan	H	2–1	9,750	Buron 22', Buengo 61'
12	22 October 2007	Le Havre	A	2–2	10,735	Giresse (2) 13', 88'
13	26 October 2007	Châteauroux	H	1–2	8,132	Buengo 90+3' (pen)
14	2 November 2007	Stade Reims	A	0–0	6,938	
15	6 November 2007	Bastia	H	1–1	8,504	Buengo 67'
16	10 November 2007	Clermont	A	2–4	4,254	Buengo 82', Ponge (o.g.) 87'
17	30 November 2007	Stade Brest	H	1–1	9,765	Giresse 11'
18	7 December 2007	Nantes	A	1–3	18,646	Pierre 21' (o.g.)
19	11 January 2008	Troyes	A	0–1	7,332	
20	18 January 2008	Dijon	H	2–2	9,435	Buengo 60', Traoré 90+2' (pen)
21	25 January 2008	Grenoble	A	2–2	5,650	Fiorèse (2) 2', 10'
22	29 January 2008	Libourne	H	1–0	8,034	Sami 45+2'
23	8 February 2008	Guingamp	H	3–1	9,090	Traoré (2) 18', 61', Kadir 63'
24	15 February 2008	Chamois Niortais	A	3–1	3,374	Buengo 14', Konaté 70' (o.g.), Mulumbu 90+2'
25	22 February 2008	Ajaccio	H	4–0	9,626	Fiorèse 4', Giresse 8', Buengo 39', Sami 64'
26	29 February 2008	Boulogne	A	1–2	5,242	Traoré 40'
27	7 March 2008	Angers	H	2–0	9,410	Buengo 60', Giresse 69'
28	14 March 2008	Montpellier	A	0–2	5,588	
29	22 March 2008	Sedan	A	1–1	7,678	Traoré 61'
30	28 March 2008	Le Havre	H	1–3	10,860	Buengo 44'
31	4 April 2008	Châteauroux	A	1–1	5,550	Buengo 20' (pen)
32	11 April 2008	Stade Reims	H	1–0	9,969	Hamed 48'
33	18 April 2008	Clermont	H	0–0	10,385	
34	22 April 2008	Bastia	A	0–1	1,989	
35	25 April 2008	Stade Brest	A	0–1	5,628	
36	2 May 2008	Nantes	H	2–1	10,296	Buengo 7' (pen), Kadir 26'
37	12 May 2008	Libourne	A	5–2	2,474	Buron 10', Giresse (2) 37', 51', Vairelles 56', Buengo 74'
38	16 May 2008	Gueugnon	H	4–4	11,272	Sami 2', Kadir 8', Traoré 50', Buengo 52'

=== Coupe de France ===
Round	Date	Opponent	Venue	Result	Scorers
R7	25 November 2007	Raismes	A	7–0	Contout 33', Traoré (2) 56', 82', Giresse 63', Buengo 68', Rabihou (2) 85', 90'
R8	15 December 2007	Mantes	H	0 – 0 (3 – 1 pens)	
Round of 64	5 January 2008	Guingamp	H	2–1	Buengo 5', Fiorèse 51'
Round of 32	2 February 2008	Gazélec Ajaccio	H	1–0	Heitzmann 25'
Round of 16	19 March 2008	Arles-Avignon	H	1 – 1 (4 – 2 pens)	Buengo 90+4'
Quarter final	15 April 2008	Dijon	H	1–0	Contout 88'
Semi final	6 May 2008	Paris Saint-Germain	H	0–1	

=== Coupe de la Ligue ===
Round	Date	Opponent	Venue	Result	Attendance	Scorers
R2	28 August 2007	Guingamp	H	1 – 1 (3 – 2 pens)	3,218	Giresse 42'
R3	26 September 2007	Strasbourg	A	2–0	3,978	Traoré 59', Kadir 90'
Round of 16	30 October 2007	Nancy	A	0–1	14,032	

== Final league table ==
Pos	Team	Pld	W	D	L	GF	GA	GD	Pts
12	Guingamp	38	11	15	12	41	37	+4	48
13	Stade Reims	38	12	10	16	44	52	−8	46
14	Amiens	38	11	12	15	49	51	−2	45
15	Châteauroux	38	11	12	15	34	42	−8	45
16	Boulogne	38	12	7	19	37	54	−17	43

Source: Ligue 2

== Squad statistics ==
No.	Pos.	Name	League		Cup		League Cup		Total	
No.	Pos.	Name	Apps	Goals	Apps	Goals	Apps	Goals	Apps	Goals
1	GK	(France) Sébastien Chabbert	37	0	1	0	0	0	38	0
3	DF	(France) Joël Sami	24	3	7	0	0	0	31	3
4	MF	(France) Carl Tourenne	14(1)	0	6	0	0	0	20(1)	0
5	DF	(Benin) Réda Johnson	5(3)	0	1	0	3	0	9(3)	0
6	MF	(France) Fabrice Levrat	17(2)	0	3	0	1	0	21(2)	0
7	MF	(France) Roy Contout	12(8)	0	2(1)	2	2(1)	0	16(10)	2
8	DF	(France) David Vairelles	29(1)	1	4	0	3	0	36(1)	1
9	FW	(France) Sébastien Heitzmann	17(10)	0	3(2)	1	1(1)	0	21(13)	1
10	FW	(France) Fabrice Begeorgi	2(3)	0	0(1)	0	0	0	2(4)	0
11	FW	(France) Gary Perchet	3(6)	0	2(1)	0	2	0	7(7)	0
12	DF	(France) David Hamed	23(6)	1	3	0	2(1)	0	28(7)	1
13	DF	(Sweden) Alexandros Pappas	1	0	2	0	0	0	3	0
14	MF	(France) Thomas Deruda	1	0	0	0	1	0	2	0
15	FW	(Angola) Titi Buengo	24(8)	14	5(1)	3	2	0	31(9)	17
16	GK	(France) Benoît Benvegnu	1(2)	0	6	0	3	0	10(2)	0
17	FW	(Cameroon) Amadou Rabihou	3(4)	1	0(1)	2	0	0	3(5)	3
18	MF	(Democratic Republic of the Congo) Youssouf Mulumbu	19(4)	1	4	0	2	0	25(4)	1
19	DF	(France) Tristan Lahaye	24(1)	1	3	0	3	0	31(1)	0
20	MF	(France) Antoine Buron	19(3)	4	1(2)	0	1(1)	0	21(6)	4
21	MF	(France) Foued Kadir	19(11)	3	6	0	3	1	28(11)	4
22	DF	(France) Aurélien Boche	27	0	2(1)	0	0	0	29(1)	0
23	MF	(France) Bakaye Traoré	28(3)	6	3(1)	2	2(1)	1	33(5)	9
24	FW	(France) Bertrand Fayolle	1(3)	0	0	0	0	0	1(3)	0
25	FW	(France) Nicolas Raynier	6(4)	1	0	0	1	0	7(4)	1
26	DF	(France) Stéphane Hernandez	11(2)	0	4	0	0	0	15(2)	0
27	FW	(France) Fabrice Fiorèse	16	3	5	1	0	0	21	4
28	MF	(France) Thibault Giresse	28(9)	7	4(2)	1	1(1)	1	33(12)	9
29	DF	(France) Quentin de Parseval	16(3)	0	1	0	0(2)	0	17(5)	0
30	GK	(France) Pierre Caillaud	0	0	0	0	0	0	0	0
33	MF	(France) Steven Nzonzi	2(1)	0	0(2)	0	0	0	2(3)	0
