= 2008–09 Amiens SC season =

Amiens SC
2008–09 season
- Chairman: Pascal Pouillet
- Manager: Thierry Laurey
- Stadium: Stade de la Licorne
- Ligue 2: 18th
- Coupe de la Ligue: Second round
- Coupe de France: Round Seven
- Top goalscorer: League: Bakaye Traoré (7); All: Bakaye Traoré (8)
Home colours	Away colours

The 2008–09 season saw Amiens SC's compete in Ligue 2 where they finished in 18th position with 43 points and were relegated to the Championnat National.

== Final league table ==
Pos	Team	Pld	W	D	L	GF	GA	GD	Pts	Promotion or Relegation
16	Ajaccio	38	11	11	16	44	56	−12	44	
17	Nîmes	38	11	11	16	32	46	−14	44	
18	Amiens (R)	38	9	16	13	35	40	−5	43	Relegation to Championnat National
19	Troyes (R)	38	9	11	18	39	48	−9	38	Relegation to Championnat National
20	Reims (R)	38	7	15	16	40	51	−11	36	Relegation to Championnat National

Source: Ligue 2
(R) Relegated

== Results ==
=== Legend ===
Win	Draw	Loss

=== Ligue 2 ===
Match	Date	Opponent	Venue	Result	Attendance	Scorers
1	1 August 2008	Boulogne	H	1–1	8,778	Contout 83'
2	8 August 2008	Montpellier	A	1–2	7,295	Baldé 86'
3	18 August 2008	Metz	H	1–1	8,612	Traoré 64' (pen)
4	22 August 2008	Châteauroux	A	0–1	3,991	
5	29 August 2008	Stade Reims	H	2–0	8,434	Tourenne 86', Baldé 90+2'
6	12 September 2008	Bastia	A	2–2	2,957	Contout 39', Giresse 90+2'
7	19 September 2008	Stade Brest	H	2–1	8,061	Heitzmann 64', Giresse 87'
8	26 September 2008	Sedan	A	1–0	7,605	Heitzmann 33'
9	3 October 2008	Vannes	H	0–2	8,294	
10	10 October 2008	Nîmes	A	1–1	7,513	Kadir 43'
11	17 October 2008	Clermont	H	0–0	8,943	
12	24 October 2008	Lens	A	0–2	32,579	
13	31 October 2008	Troyes	H	1–1	8,851	Traoré 29'
14	7 November 2008	Angers	A	0–1	6,939	
15	14 November 2008	Ajaccio	H	2–0	9,721	Contout 7', Heitzmann 84'
16	28 November 2008	Tours	A	0–0	3,757	
17	8 December 2008	Strasbourg	H	1–1	10,622	Contout 11'
18	19 December 2008	Guingamp	A	0–0	10,459	
19	16 January 2009	Montpellier	H	2–0	8,120	Giresse (2) 53', 69'
20	27 January 2009	Dijon	A	1–2	3,150	Traoré 54'
21	30 January 2009	Metz	A	1–2	7,139	Baldé 90'
22	6 February 2009	Châteauroux	H	1–1	9,200	Baldé 77'
23	13 February 2009	Stade Reims	A	3–1	13,136	Contout 36', Baldé 41', Traoré 50'
24	20 February 2009	Bastia	H	0–1	8,741	
25	27 February 2009	Stade Brest	A	2–1	4,497	Kadir (2) 34', 69'
26	7 March 2009	Sedan	H	0–0	9,471	
27	13 March 2009	Vannes	A	1–2	2,888	Giresse 8'
28	20 March 2009	Nîmes	H	0–1	10,043	
29	27 March 2009	Clermont	A	0–2	4,914	
30	6 April 2009	Lens	H	0–0	11,859	
31	10 April 2009	Troyes	A	1–0	17,329	Traoré 90'
32	17 April 2009	Angers	H	1–1	11,003	Giresse 46'
33	24 April 2009	Ajaccio	A	2–0	2,279	Contout (2) 25', 85'
34	1 May 2009	Tours	H	0–0	9,206	
35	8 May 2009	Strasbourg	A	1–2	13,765	Nzonzi 60'
36	15 May 2009	Guingamp	H	3–3	10,301	Traoré (3) 56', 67', 87'
37	22 May 2009	Dijon	H	1–1	9,749	Levrat 27'
38	29 May 2009	Boulogne	A	0–4	8,688	

=== Coupe de France ===
Round	Date	Opponent	Venue	Result	Scorers
R7	22 November 2008	Saint-Omer	A	0–1	

=== Coupe de la Ligue ===
Round	Date	Opponent	Venue	Result	Scorers
R2	9 September 2008	Vannes	A	2–3	Baldé 55', Traoré 59'

== Squad statistics ==
No.	Pos.	Name	League		Cup		League Cup		Total	
No.	Pos.	Name	Apps	Goals	Apps	Goals	Apps	Goals	Apps	Goals
4	DF	(France) Carl Tourenne	29	1	0	0	1	0	30	1
5	DF	(Benin) Réda Johnson	4(3)	0	1	0	0	0	5(3)	0
6	MF	(France) Fabrice Levrat	30	1	0	0	1	0	31	1
7	FW	(Algeria) Malek Aït Alia	1(3)	0	0	0	0	0	1(3)	0
8	MF	(France) Antoine Buron	6	0	0	0	0	0	6	0
9	FW	(France) Omar Kossoko	0(1)	0	0	0	0	0	0(1)	0
10	FW	(France) Sébastien Heitzmann	13(9)	3	1	0	0	0	14(9)	3
11	MF	(France) Roy Contout	27(8)	7	1	0	1	0	29(8)	7
14	DF	(France) Eddy Viator	29(2)	0	0	0	1	0	30(2)	0
15	MF	(France) Steven Nzonzi	22(12)	1	1	0	1	0	24(12)	1
16	GK	(France) Paul Delecroix	1(1)	0	1	0	0	0	2(1)	0
18	FW	(France) Abdoulaye Baldé	14(21)	5	0(1)	0	1	1	16(22)	6
19	MF	(France) Benjamin Laurant	5(8)	0	0(1)	0	1	0	6(9)	0
20	DF	(France) Maxime Brillault	21(2)	0	0	0	0	0	21(2)	0
21	MF	(France) Foued Kadir	30(7)	3	0(1)	0	1	0	31(8)	3
22	DF	(France) Aurélien Boche	1	0	1	0	0	0	2	0
23	MF	(France) Bakaye Traoré	29(7)	7	1	0	1	1	31(7)	8
24	DF	(France) Benoît Haaby	36	0	0	0	1	0	37	0
25	FW	(France) Nicolas Raynier	6(9)	0	1	0	0(1)	0	7(10)	0
27	DF	(France) Samuel Allegro	32	0	1	0	1	0	34	0
28	MF	(France) Thibault Giresse	34(4)	5	1	0	0(1)	0	35(5)	5
29	DF	(France) Quentin de Parseval	15(4)	0	1	0	0	0	16(4)	0
30	GK	(France) Benoît Benvegnu	37	0	0	0	1	0	38	0
