= 2009–10 Ligue 2 =

71st season of the second-tier football league in France

Ligue 2
- Season: 2009–10
- Champions: Caen
- Promoted: Caen; Brest; Arles-Avignon
- Relegated: Guingamp; Strasbourg; Bastia
- Matches played: 380
- Goals scored: 883 (2.32 per match)
- Top goalscorer: Olivier Giroud (21)
- Biggest home win: Bastia 6–1 Nîmes (18 August 2009); Nantes 5–0 Istres (21 August 2009)
- Biggest away win: Nîmes 0–4 Caen (27 November 2009)
- Highest scoring: Dijon FCO 5–4 Châteauroux (30 October 2009)

The Ligue 2 2009–10 season was the sixty-ninth edition since its establishment. The fixtures were announced on 5 June 2009, and the league began on 7 August and ended on 14 May 2010.

German sportswear company Puma became the official provider of match balls for the season after agreeing to a long term partnership with the Ligue de Football Professionnel.

== Promotion and relegation ==
Teams relegated from 2008–09 Ligue 1

- 18th Place: Caen
- 19th Place: Nantes
- 20th Place: Le Havre

Teams promoted to 2009–10 Ligue 1

- Champions: Lens
- Runners-up: Montpellier
- 3rd Place: Boulogne

Teams promoted from 2008–09 Championnat National

- Champions: Istres
- Runners-up: Laval
- 3rd Place: Arles-Avignon

Teams relegated to 2009–10 Championnat National

- 18th Place: Amiens
- 19th Place: Reims
- 20th Place: Troyes

== DNCG Ruling on Arles-Avignon ==
All clubs that secured status for Ligue 2 play this season had to be approve by the DNCG before becoming eligible to participate.

On 23 June, the DNCG ruled that AC Arles-Avignon would not be allowed to play in Ligue 2 following their promotion from the Championnat National, due to irregularities in the club's financial accounts and management. On 3 July, following an appeal, the DNCG reversed its decision reinstating Arles' Ligue 2 status.

== League table ==
Pos	Team	Pld	W	D	L	GF	GA	GD	Pts	Promotion or Relegation
1	Caen (C, P)	38	18	15	5	52	30	+22	69	Promotion to Ligue 1
2	Brest (P)	38	20	7	11	53	34	+19	67	Promotion to Ligue 1
3	Arles-Avignon (P)	38	16	12	10	43	39	+4	60	Promotion to Ligue 1
4	Metz	38	14	14	10	43	39	+4	56	
5	Angers	38	15	10	13	46	43	+3	55	
6	Clermont	38	15	9	14	48	41	+7	54	
7	Le Havre	38	14	10	14	45	50	−5	52	
8	Laval	38	11	18	9	49	41	+8	51	
9	Dijon	38	12	15	11	52	46	+6	51	
10	Nîmes	38	13	12	13	37	43	−6	51	
11	Tours	38	11	16	11	47	46	+1	49	
12	Sedan	38	11	16	11	46	46	0	49	
13	Ajaccio	38	13	9	16	41	42	−1	48	
14	Vannes	38	11	13	14	40	49	−9	46	
15	Nantes	38	12	9	17	43	54	−11	45	
16	Châteauroux	38	10	14	14	50	54	−4	44	
17	Istres	38	11	11	16	34	52	−18	44	
18	Guingamp (R)	38	9	16	13	35	40	−5	43	Originally relegated to 2010-11 Championnat de France Amateur but instead relegated to Championnat National (Note: On 15 June 2010, following a review of each club's administrative and financial accounts in the Championnat National, the DNCG ruled that both Bastia and Gueugnon would be relegated to the Championnat de France amateur, while Amiens, Guingamp, and Strasbourg were having its accounts subjected to further deliberation to determine whether each club could retain its professional status. Both Bastia and Gueugnon had the option to appeal the decision. On 25 June 2010, the Corsican Assembly and the General Council of Haute-Corse approved grants of €800,000 and €150,000 to be given to Bastia in order for the club to meet the DNCG's financial requirements, which would allow the club to remain in the Championnat National. However, on 6 July, the DNCG remained firm on its stance relegating the club to the fourth division after questioning the legitimacy of the grants and the sale of the club's training center. Bastia president, Julien Lolli, remained confident that the club would play in the Championnat National and issued an appeal to the CNOSF, the National Sporting Committee of France, the same day. On 2 July, the DNCG announced that Gueugnon would remain in National after the club successfully appealed to the organisation. On 16 July, the CNOSF ruled against the DNCG and announced that Bastia should play in the Championnat National. The club's place in the league was confirmed upon the release of the league table. On 2 July, local media in Alsace reported that Strasbourg were on the verge of being relegated to the Championnat de France amateur by the DNCG due to financial issues. The club responded by announcing its willingness to appeal if the news reported was confirmed. With the club's accounts still being reviewed, Strasbourg's financial issues were slightly alleviated after the sale of striker Magaye Gueye to English club Everton for €1.4 million. Strasbourg later transferred captain Guillaume Lacour and Algerian international Yacine Bezzaz to Évian and Troyes, respectively, for nominal fees. On 16 July, the report was confirmed when the DNCG officially relegated Strasbourg to the CFA. Strasbourg appealed the decision the following week. On 22 July, Strasbourg's appeal was successful with the DNCG ruling in favour of a return to National. The return of Strasbourg to National means that twenty-one clubs competed in the 2010–11 edition of the league.)
19	Strasbourg (R)	38	9	15	14	42	49	−7	42	Originally relegated to 2010-11 Championnat de France Amateur but instead relegated to Championnat National
20	Bastia (R)	38	10	9	19	40	48	−8	39	Originally relegated to 2010-11 Championnat de France Amateur but instead relegated to Championnat National

Source: Ligue 2
Rules for classification: 1) points; 2) goal difference; 3) number of goals scored.
(C) Champions; (P) Promoted; (R) Relegated

== Results ==
Home \ Away	ACA	ANG	ACAA	BAS	BRS	CAE	CHA	CLR	DIJ	GUI	IST	LVL	LHA	MET	NAN	NMS	SED	STR	TOU	VAN
Ajaccio		0–2	1–0	0–1	0–0	2–0	1–0	1–1	0–0	0–1	1–2	1–1	3–0	1–1	2–1	2–0	2–0	2–2	2–2	1–1
Angers	2–1		3–1	2–0	1–2	2–2	0–3	2–1	3–0	1–0	1–0	2–1	0–0	0–1	2–0	1–0	1–1	0–0	0–1	2–0
Arles-Avignon	2–1	1–1		1–0	3–2	0–0	3–0	1–0	0–0	1–1	3–0	2–0	1–0	2–0	1–0	2–0	1–0	1–1	1–2	1–1
Bastia	1–0	3–1	3–0		1–1	1–2	0–1	1–3	3–4	0–0	2–0	0–1	1–1	1–0	1–1	6–1	2–0	1–0	3–0	1–2
Brest	0–1	2–0	3–1	4–0		2–0	2–1	2–0	1–4	2–0	1–0	2–1	2–1	2–1	1–2	1–0	1–3	1–1	2–0	3–4
Caen	1–0	2–1	1–0	1–0	1–0		1–1	2–1	1–0	2–0	1–1	1–1	2–0	0–2	1–0	0–0	3–1	0–0	0–0	4–2
Châteauroux	1–2	2–0	3–0	2–2	1–1	1–1		1–3	1–3	0–1	0–2	2–1	3–1	1–2	2–2	1–2	1–0	2–1	0–3	0–0
Clermont	3–0	3–2	1–2	0–0	0–1	1–3	0–0		0–2	3–1	2–0	0–0	1–0	2–0	2–0	0–1	0–3	3–0	0–0	1–0
Dijon	3–0	2–2	1–1	1–0	1–3	1–1	5–4	2–3		1–0	1–1	0–0	1–2	0–1	1–2	1–0	3–1	0–0	2–2	0–0
Guingamp	2–1	0–0	4–1	1–1	0–0	0–0	1–1	1–1	1–1		0–0	0–0	1–2	2–1	2–0	0–0	2–2	2–0	2–2	4–1
Istres	0–2	1–1	1–1	1–0	1–0	2–1	2–0	1–3	1–1	0–0		0–2	0–1	2–2	1–0	2–1	3–1	2–0	2–1	1–1
Laval	2–2	2–2	0–1	1–1	1–2	2–1	0–0	0–0	2–2	3–0	2–2		4–0	3–3	0–1	0–0	1–1	3–2	1–0	2–1
Le Havre	1–0	3–2	1–2	3–1	1–0	1–1	2–2	2–1	1–1	2–1	2–1	0–2		2–0	4–0	0–2	3–1	3–0	1–1	0–1
Metz	2–0	1–0	1–2	1–0	0–0	1–3	0–0	2–1	0–0	2–0	2–0	3–2	2–0		0–0	3–1	1–1	1–0	1–1	0–1
Nantes	1–0	1–2	1–0	3–1	1–4	1–3	2–2	3–2	0–1	0–2	5–0	0–0	4–1	2–2		2–1	1–3	2–1	2–1	0–0
Nîmes	2–0	0–1	1–1	2–1	1–0	0–4	1–4	0–1	2–1	2–0	2–1	1–1	1–1	1–1	2–1		3–0	2–1	1–1	1–1
Sedan	1–3	2–2	0–0	1–0	0–0	0–0	1–1	2–1	2–1	1–0	1–1	0–0	1–1	1–1	3–0	0–0		3–3	2–0	0–1
Strasbourg	2–0	1–2	1–1	2–1	1–0	2–2	1–2	1–1	3–1	2–1	2–0	4–1	1–1	1–1	1–0	1–1	2–2		0–1	1–0
Tours	1–3	2–0	4–2	0–0	0–1	1–1	2–2	1–1	1–4	2–0	4–0	0–3	2–0	1–1	1–1	0–0	1–3	2–0		1–1
Vannes	0–3	1–0	0–0	3–0	0–2	0–3	3–2	1–2	1–0	2–2	2–0	2–3	1–1	3–0	1–1	0–2	0–2	1–1	1–2	

Source: Ligue 2
Legend: Blue = home team win; Yellow = draw; Red = away team win.

== Statistics ==
=== Top goalscorers ===
Rank	Player	Club	Goals
1	(France) Olivier Giroud	Tours	21
2	(France) Anthony Modeste	Angers	20
3	(Uruguay) Sebastián Ribas	Dijon	16
4	(France) Nolan Roux	Brest	15
5	(France) Pierre-Yves André	Bastia	14
6	(France) Lynel Kitambala	Dijon	13
6	(France) Nicolas Fauvergue	Strasbourg	13
6	(Angola) Titi Buengo	Châteauroux	13
6	(Mali) Mamadou Diallo	Le Havre	13
6	(France) Alexis Allart	Sedan	13

Last updated: 3 June 2010
Source: Ligue 2

=== Assists table ===
Rank	Player	Club	Assists
1	(France) Benjamin Nivet	Caen	11
2	(France) Benjamin Psaume	Arles-Avignon	10
2	(France) Bruno Grougi	Brest	10
4	(France) Fatih Atik	Tours	9
4	(France) Jérôme Lebouc	Laval	9

Last updated: 3 June 2010
Source: Ligue 2

=== Scoring ===
- First goal of the season: Magaye Gueye for Strasbourg against Châteauroux, 1 minute and 20 seconds. (7 August 2009).
- Fastest goal in a match: 8 seconds – Rémi Maréval for Nantes against Nîmes. (26 September 2009).
- Goal scored at the latest point in a match: 90+2 minutes and 36 seconds – Nolan Roux for Brest against Laval (7 August 2009)
- First own goal of the season: Thomas Mienniel (Angers) for Châteauroux, 38 minutes and 27 seconds (18 August 2009)
- First penalty kick of the season: 5 minutes and 27 seconds – Jérôme Lebouc (scored) for Laval against Brest (7 August 2009).
- First hat-trick of the season: Christophe Gaffory for Bastia against Nîmes (18 August 2009); 3', 17', 52'.
- Most goals scored in a game by one player: 4 goals by Olivier Giroud for Tours against Arles-Avignon (18 September 2009); 7', 44', 65', 90'.
- Widest winning margin: 5 goals
  - Bastia 6–1 Nîmes (18 August 2009).
  - Nantes 5–0 Istres (21 August 2009).
- Most goals in a match: 9 goals
  - Dijon 5–4 Châteauroux (30 October 2009).
- Most goals in one half: 5 goals
  - Dijon v Châteauroux (30 October 2009); 1–3 at half time, 5–4 final.

=== Discipline ===
- First yellow card of the season: Yvan Bourgis for Brest against Laval, 5 minutes and 37 seconds (7 August 2009)
- First red card of the season: Vincent Bessat for Metz against Vannes, 57 minutes and 43 seconds (7 August 2009)
- Card given at latest point in a game: Wahbi Khazri (yellow) at 90+4 minutes and 9 seconds for Bastia against Caen (14 August 2009)
- Total cards in a single match: 9
  - Nantes 5–0 Istres – 6 for Nantes (Ibrahim Tall, William Vainqueur (yellow), Tenema N'Diaye, William Vainqueur (red), Ivan Klasnić, & Stefan Babović) and 3 for Istres (Mamadou Doumbia, Faouzi El Brazi, & Adel Chedli) (21 August 2009)
- Most yellow cards in a single match: 9
  - Ajaccio 0–1 Guingamp – 5 for Ajaccio (Kévin Diaz, Thierry Debès, Jean-Philippe Sabo, Thomas Deruda, & Jonathan Martins) and 4 for Guingamp (Alharbi El-Jadeyaoui, Felipe Saad, Sébastien Grax, & Christian Bassila) (7 August 2009)
- Most red cards in a single match: 3 – Bastia 6–1 Nîmes – 1 for Bastia (Mehdi Méniri) and 2 for Nîmes (Moussa Sidibé & Miodrag Stošić) (18 August 2009)

== Awards ==
The nominees for the Player of the Year, Goalkeeper of the Year, and Manager of the Year in Ligue 2. The winner was determined at the annual UNFP Awards, which was held on 9 May. The winners are displayed in bold.

=== Player of the Year ===
Player	Nationality	Club
Benjamin Nivet	France	Caen
**Olivier Giroud**	**France**	**Tours**
Nolan Roux	France	Stade Brest
Anthony Modeste	France	Angers

=== Goalkeeper of the Year ===
Player	Nationality	Club
Benoît Costil	France	Sedan
**Steeve Elana**	**France**	**Stade Brest**
Cyrille Merville	France	Arles-Avignon
Aléxis Thébaux	France	Caen

=== Manager of the Year ===
Manager	Nationality	Club
Franck Dumas	France	Caen
**Alex Dupont**	**France**	**Stade Brest**
Michel Estevan	France	Arles-Avignon
Philippe Hinschberger	France	Laval

=== Team of the Year ===

Ligue 2 Team of the Year

Position	Player	Club
Goalkeeper	(France) Steeve Elana	Brest
Defender	(Senegal) Omar Daf	Brest
Defender	(France) Grégory Leca	Caen
Defender	(France) Paul Baysse	Sedan
Defender	(France) Grégory Tafforeau	Caen
Midfielder	(France) Bruno Grougi	Brest
Midfielder	(France) Benjamin Nivet	Caen
Midfielder	(France) Romain Hamouma	Laval
Forward	(France) Nolan Roux	Brest
Forward	(France) Olivier Giroud	Tours
Forward	(France) Anthony Modeste	Angers

== Team information ==
Club	Chairman	Manager	Appointed
Ajaccio	(France) Michel Moretti	(France) Olivier Pantaloni	2009–
Angers	(France) Willy Bernard	(France) Jean-Louis Garcia	2006–
Arles	(France) Jean-Marc Conrad	(France) Michel Estevan	2009–
Bastia	(France) Charles Orlanducci	(Bosnia and Herzegovina) Faruk Hadžibegić	2009–
Brest	(France) Daniel Leroux	(France) Alex Dupont	2009–
Caen	(France) Jean-François Fortin	(France) Franck Dumas	2004–
Châteauroux	(France) Patrick Le Seyec	(France) Jean-Pierre Papin	2009–
Clermont	(France) Claude Michy	(Armenia) Michel Der Zakarian	2009–
Dijon	(France) Bernard Gnecchi	(France) Patrice Carteron	2009–
Guingamp	(France) Noël Le Graët	(France) Victor Zvunka	2007–
Istres	(France) Bertrand Benoît	(France) Nicolas Usai	2008–
Laval	(France) Bruno Lucas	(France) Philippe Hinschberger	2007–
Le Havre	(France) Jean-Pierre Louvel	(France) Cédric Daury	2009–
Metz	(France) Bernard Serin	(France) Joël Müller	2010–
Nantes	(Poland) Waldemar Kita	(France) Baptiste Gentili	2010–
Nîmes	(France) Jean-Louis Gazeau	(France) Jean-Michel Cavalli	2008–
Sedan	(France) Pascal Urano	(France) Landry Chauvin	2008–
Strasbourg	(France) Philippe Ginestet	(France) Pascal Janin	2009–
Tours	(France) Frédéric Sebag	(France) Daniel Sanchez	2007–
Vannes	(France) Michel Jestin	(France) Stéphane Le Mignan	2002–

== Stadiums ==
Location of teams in Ligue 2 2009–10

Last updated: 15 May 2010

Team	Stadium	Capacity	Avg. attendance
Ajaccio	Stade François Coty	12,000	2,123
Angers	Stade Jean-Bouin	16,300	6,591
Arles	Parc des Sports	7,500	4,141
Bastia	Stade Armand Cesari	12,000	2,836
Brest	Stade Francis-Le Blé	10,228	7,702
Caen	Stade Michel d'Ornano	21,500	13,199
Châteauroux	Stade Gaston Petit	17,000	6,407
Clermont	Stade Gabriel Montpied	10,363	4,429
Dijon	Stade Gaston Gérard	7,900	5,420
Guingamp	Stade du Roudourou	18,126	10,780
Istres	Stade Parsemain	17,468	2,235
Laval	Stade Francis Le Basser	18,703	6,679
Le Havre	Stade Jules Deschaseaux	16,400	8,244
Metz	Stade Saint-Symphorien	26,700	11,232
Nantes	Stade de la Beaujoire	38,285	15,814
Nîmes	Stade des Costières	18,482	8,265
Sedan	Stade Louis Dugauguez	23,189	8,984
Strasbourg	Stade de la Meinau	29,230	11,328
Tours	Stade de la Vallée du Cher	13,500	5,639
Vannes	Stade de la Rabine	8,000	4,291
