= 2003–04 Amiens SC season =

Amiens SC
2003–04 season
- Head coach: Denis Troch
- Stadium: Stade de la Licorne
- Ligue 2: 9th
- Coupe de France: Quarter-finals
- Coupe de la Ligue: First round

The 2003–04 season was the 103rd season in the existence of Amiens SC and the club's third consecutive season in the second division of French football. In addition to the domestic league, Amiens SC participated in this season's editions of the Coupe de France and the Coupe de la Ligue.

== Pre-season and friendlies ==
Win Draw Loss

== Competitions ==
=== Overall record ===
Competition	First match	Last match	Starting round	Final position	Record							
Competition	First match	Last match	Starting round	Final position	Pld	W	D	L	GF	GA	GD	Win %
Ligue 2	2 August 2003	22 May 2004	Matchday 1	9th	38	15	8	15	43	45	−2	39.47
Coupe de France	21 November 2003	16 March 2004	Seventh round	Quarter-finals	6	5	0	1	10	2	+8	83.33
Coupe de la Ligue	24 September 2003		First round	First round	1	0	0	1	0	1	−1	0.00
Total					45	20	8	17	53	48	+5	44.44

Source: Competitions

=== Ligue 2 ===
==== League table ====
Pos	Team	Pld	W	D	L	GF	GA	GD	Pts	Promotion or Relegation
7	Le Havre	38	15	10	13	44	46	−2	55	
8	Niort	38	13	14	11	47	44	+3	53	
9	Amiens	38	15	8	15	43	45	−2	53	
10	Troyes	38	13	13	12	43	48	−5	52	
11	Châteauroux	38	13	10	15	44	49	−5	49	Qualification for the UEFA Cup first round (Note: Since the Coupe de France winners Paris Saint-Germain qualified for the Champions League, their place in the UEFA Cup went to Châteauroux, who were the Coupe de France runners-up.)

Source: Ligue 2

==== Results summary ====
Overall								Home						Away					
Pld	W	D	L	GF	GA	GD	Pts	W	D	L	GF	GA	GD	W	D	L	GF	GA	GD
38	15	8	15	43	45	−2	53	8	5	6	22	21	+1	7	3	9	21	24	−3

Source: Ligue 2

==== Results by round ====
Round	1	2	3	4	5	6	7	8	9	10	11	12	13	14	15	16	17	18	19	20	21	22	23	24	25	26	27	28	29	30	31	32	33	34	35	36	37	38
Ground	A	H	A	H	A	H	A	H	A	H	A	H	A	A	H	A	H	A	H	A	H	A	H	A	H	A	H	A	H	A	H	H	A	H	A	H	A	H
Result	W	W	W	D	D	W	L	D	W	W	L	D	D	W	D	L	W	W	L	W	W	L	L	W	W	L	L	D	D	L	W	W	L	L	L	L	L	L
Position	5	3	2	3	3	2	2	2	2	2	2	2	4	2	3	5	4	2	5	2	2	2	3	2	2	4	5	5	5	6	5	4	4	5	6	6	7	9

Source: Ligue 2
A = Away; H = Home; W = Win; D = Draw; L = Loss

==== Matches ====
2 August 2003 1	Laval	1–2	Amiens	Laval
--:-- CEST (UTC+2)

9 August 2003 2	Amiens	1–0	Angers	Amiens
20:00 CEST (UTC+2)	Leroy 53'	Report		Stadium: Stade de la Licorne; Attendance: 5,960; Referee: Serge Fidri

16 August 2003 3	Gueugnon	0–1	Amiens	Gueugnon
--:-- CEST (UTC+2)

19 August 2003 4	Amiens	0–0	Istres	Amiens
--:-- CEST (UTC+2)

23 August 2003 5	Niort	0–0	Amiens	Niort
--:-- CEST (UTC+2)

30 August 2003 6	Amiens	2–0	Le Havre	Amiens
--:-- CEST (UTC+2)

5 September 2003 7	Lorient	3–1	Amiens	Lorient
--:-- CEST (UTC+2)

13 September 2003 8	Amiens	0–0	Châteauroux	Amiens
--:-- CEST (UTC+2)

21 September 2003 9	Saint-Étienne	0–2	Amiens	Saint-Étienne
--:-- CEST (UTC+2)

27 September 2003 10	Amiens	1–0	Créteil	Amiens
--:-- CEST (UTC+2)

4 October 2003 11	Valence	2–1	Amiens	Valence
--:-- CEST (UTC+2)

20 October 2003 12	Amiens	1–1	Sedan
--:-- CEST (UTC+2)

25 October 2003 13	Nancy	0–0	Amiens
--:-- CEST (UTC+2)

31 October 2003 14	Besançon	0–2	Amiens
--:-- CET (UTC+1)

8 November 2003 15	Amiens	1–1	Troyes	Amiens
--:-- CET (UTC+1)

30 November 2003 16	Caen	2–1	Amiens
--:-- CET (UTC+1)

3 December 2003 17	Amiens	2–1	Rouen
--:-- CET (UTC+1)

6 December 2003 18	Clermont	0–2	Amiens
--:-- CET (UTC+1)

20 December 2003 19	Amiens	0–1	Grenoble	Amiens
--:-- CET (UTC+1)

12 January 2004 20	Angers	1–2	Amiens	Angers
--:-- CET (UTC+1)

17 January 2004 21	Amiens	1–0	Gueugnon	Amiens
--:-- CET (UTC+1)

1 February 2004 22	Istres	1–0	Amiens	Istres
--:-- CET (UTC+1)

7 February 2004 23	Amiens	2–3	Niort	Amiens
--:-- CET (UTC+1)

15 February 2004 24	Le Havre	0–1	Amiens	Le Havre
--:-- CET (UTC+1)

22 February 2004 25	Amiens	1–0	Lorient	Amiens
--:-- CET (UTC+1)

27 February 2004 26	Châteauroux	4–1	Amiens	Châteauroux
--:-- CET (UTC+1)

5 March 2004 27	Amiens	1–2	Saint-Étienne	Amiens
--:-- CET (UTC+1)

13 March 2004 28	Créteil	1–1	Amiens	Créteil
--:-- CET (UTC+1)

20 March 2004 29	Amiens	2–2	Valence	Amiens
--:-- CET (UTC+1)

27 March 2004 30	Sedan	3–1	Amiens	Sedan
--:-- CET (UTC+1)

3 April 2004 31	Amiens	2–1	Nancy	Amiens
--:-- CEST (UTC+2)

10 April 2004 32	Amiens	1–0	Besançon	Amiens
--:-- CEST (UTC+2)

24 April 2004 33	Troyes	3–2	Amiens	Troyes
--:-- CEST (UTC+2)

2 May 2004 34	Amiens	0–3	Caen	Amiens
--:-- CEST (UTC+2)

8 May 2004 35	Rouen	2–1	Amiens	Rouen
--:-- CEST (UTC+2)

12 May 2004 36	Amiens	1–2	Clermont	Amiens
--:-- CEST (UTC+2)

16 May 2004 37	Grenoble	1–0	Amiens	Grenoble
--:-- CEST (UTC+2)

22 May 2004 38	Amiens	3–4	Laval	Amiens
--:-- CEST (UTC+2)

=== Coupe de France ===
11 February 2004 Round of 16	Amiens	1–0	Caen	Amiens
20:00 CET (UTC+1)	Buron 9'			Stadium: Stade de la Licorne; Attendance: 5,816; Referee: Stéphane Moulin

16 March 2004 Quarter-finals	Amiens	0–1	Dijon	Amiens
18:00 CET (UTC+1)			Heitzmann 86'	Stadium: Stade de la Licorne; Attendance: 8,037; Referee: Bertrand Layec
