= List of French football transfers 2008 =

French football transfers by club 2008/2009 (winter/summer)

== Auxerre ==
In: (Winter) Note: Flags indicate national team as defined under FIFA eligibility rules; some limited exceptions apply. Players may hold more than one non-FIFA nationality.

| No. | Pos. | Nation | Player |
|---|---|---|---|
| — | DF | MKD | Robert Popov (from Litex Lovech) |

In: (Summer) Note: Flags indicate national team as defined under FIFA eligibility rules; some limited exceptions apply. Players may hold more than one non-FIFA nationality.

| No. | Pos. | Nation | Player |
|---|---|---|---|
| — | DF | FRA | Jérémy Berthod (from AS Monaco) |

Out: (Winter) Note: Flags indicate national team as defined under FIFA eligibility rules; some limited exceptions apply. Players may hold more than one non-FIFA nationality.

| No. | Pos. | Nation | Player |

Out: (Summer) Note: Flags indicate national team as defined under FIFA eligibility rules; some limited exceptions apply. Players may hold more than one non-FIFA nationality.

| No. | Pos. | Nation | Player |
|---|---|---|---|
| — | FW | FRA | Ludovic Genest (on loan to SC Bastia) |

== Bordeaux ==
In: (Summer) Note: Flags indicate national team as defined under FIFA eligibility rules; some limited exceptions apply. Players may hold more than one non-FIFA nationality.

| No. | Pos. | Nation | Player |
|---|---|---|---|
| — | FW | FRA | Yoan Gouffran (from SM Caen) €6.5m |
| — | MF | FRA | Yoann Gourcuff (on loan from Milan) |

Out: (Summer) Note: Flags indicate national team as defined under FIFA eligibility rules; some limited exceptions apply. Players may hold more than one non-FIFA nationality.

| No. | Pos. | Nation | Player |

== Caen ==
In: (Summer) Note: Flags indicate national team as defined under FIFA eligibility rules; some limited exceptions apply. Players may hold more than one non-FIFA nationality.

| No. | Pos. | Nation | Player |
|---|---|---|---|
| — | DF | ARG | Pablo Barzola (from Argentinos Juniors) |

Out: (Summer) Note: Flags indicate national team as defined under FIFA eligibility rules; some limited exceptions apply. Players may hold more than one non-FIFA nationality.

| No. | Pos. | Nation | Player |
|---|---|---|---|
| — | FW | FRA | Yoan Gouffran (to FC Bordeaux) €6.5m |
| — | GK | FRA | Benoît Costil (on loan to Vannes OC) |

== Grenoble Foot ==
In: Note: Flags indicate national team as defined under FIFA eligibility rules; some limited exceptions apply. Players may hold more than one non-FIFA nationality.

| No. | Pos. | Nation | Player |
|---|---|---|---|
| — | DF | CZE | Zoran Rendulić (from FK Borac Čačak) |

Out: Note: Flags indicate national team as defined under FIFA eligibility rules; some limited exceptions apply. Players may hold more than one non-FIFA nationality.

| No. | Pos. | Nation | Player |

== Le Havre ==
In: (Summer) Note: Flags indicate national team as defined under FIFA eligibility rules; some limited exceptions apply. Players may hold more than one non-FIFA nationality.

| No. | Pos. | Nation | Player |
|---|---|---|---|
| — | FW | FRA | Nicolas Dieuze (from Toulouse) |

Out: (Summer) Note: Flags indicate national team as defined under FIFA eligibility rules; some limited exceptions apply. Players may hold more than one non-FIFA nationality.

| No. | Pos. | Nation | Player |

== Le Mans ==
In: Note: Flags indicate national team as defined under FIFA eligibility rules; some limited exceptions apply. Players may hold more than one non-FIFA nationality.

| No. | Pos. | Nation | Player |
|---|---|---|---|
| — | DF | BRA | Geder (from Spartak Moscow) |
| — | MF | BEN | Khaled Adénon (from ASEC Abidjan) |
| — | MF | TUN | Saber Ben Frej (from Étoile Sahel) |
| — | FW | FRA | Anthony Le Tallec (from Liverpool) £1.1m |
| — | MF | NOR | Fredrik Stromstad (from IK Start) |
| — | FW | NOR | Thorstein Helstad (from SK Brann) |

Out: Note: Flags indicate national team as defined under FIFA eligibility rules; some limited exceptions apply. Players may hold more than one non-FIFA nationality.

| No. | Pos. | Nation | Player |
|---|---|---|---|
| — | MF | JPN | Daisuke Matsui (to Saint-Étienne) |
| — | MF | CIV | Romaric (to Sevilla) €8m |
| — | MF | FRA | Hassan Yebda (to Benfica) |

== Lille ==
In: Note: Flags indicate national team as defined under FIFA eligibility rules; some limited exceptions apply. Players may hold more than one non-FIFA nationality.

| No. | Pos. | Nation | Player |
|---|---|---|---|
| — | MF | FRA | Rio Antonio Mavuba (on loan from Villarreal) |
| — | FW | FRA | Pierre-Alain Frau (from PSG) |
| — | MF | SWE | Emil Lyng (from AGF) |
| — | FW | COD | Cedric Baseya (free from Southampton) |

Out: Note: Flags indicate national team as defined under FIFA eligibility rules; some limited exceptions apply. Players may hold more than one non-FIFA nationality.

| No. | Pos. | Nation | Player |
|---|---|---|---|
| — | MF | CMR | Jean Makoun (to Lyon) €14m |

== Lorient ==
In: Note: Flags indicate national team as defined under FIFA eligibility rules; some limited exceptions apply. Players may hold more than one non-FIFA nationality.

| No. | Pos. | Nation | Player |
|---|---|---|---|
| — | MF | FRA | Morgan Amalfitano (from CS Sedan) |
| — | GK | FRA | Alban Joinel (from Carqefou) |
| — | MF | FRA | Antoine Buron (from Amiens) |
| — | FW | FRA | Kevin Gameiro (from RC Strasbourg) |

Out: Note: Flags indicate national team as defined under FIFA eligibility rules; some limited exceptions apply. Players may hold more than one non-FIFA nationality.

| No. | Pos. | Nation | Player |

== Lyon ==
In: Note: Flags indicate national team as defined under FIFA eligibility rules; some limited exceptions apply. Players may hold more than one non-FIFA nationality.

| No. | Pos. | Nation | Player |
|---|---|---|---|
| — | MF | CMR | Jean Makoun (from Lille) €14m |
| — | GK | FRA | Hugo Lloris (from Nice) €8.5m |
| — | MF | BRA | Ederson (from Nice) €15m |
| — | DF | FRA | Jean-Alain Boumsong (from Juventus) |
| — | MF | ESP | Marc Crosas (on loan from Barcelona) |
| — | DF | GHA | John Mensah (from Stade Rennais F.C.) €8.4m |
| — | FW | ARG | César Delgado (from Cruz Azul) €11m |
| — | FW | CZE | Milan Baroš (loan return from Portsmouth) |

Out: Note: Flags indicate national team as defined under FIFA eligibility rules; some limited exceptions apply. Players may hold more than one non-FIFA nationality.

| No. | Pos. | Nation | Player |
|---|---|---|---|
| — | FW | FRA | Loïc Rémy (to Nice) |
| — | GK | FRA | Grégory Coupet (to Atlético Madrid) €1.5m |
| — | MF | FRA | Hatem Ben Arfa (to Marseille) £9.5m |
| — | DF | FRA | Sébastien Squillaci (to Sevilla) £5m |
| — | FW | CZE | Milan Baroš (to Galatasaray) €5.5m |

== Marseille ==
In:

Summer 08 Note: Flags indicate national team as defined under FIFA eligibility rules; some limited exceptions apply. Players may hold more than one non-FIFA nationality.

| No. | Pos. | Nation | Player |
|---|---|---|---|
| — | GK | FRA | Rudy Riou (from Toulouse) |
| — | DF | MAR | Amin Erbati (from Raja Casablanca) |
| — | DF | BRA | Hilton (from RC Lens) |
| — | DF | JAM | Tyrone Mears (on loan from Derby County) |
| — | MF | FRA | Hatem Ben Arfa (from Lyon) £9.5m |
| — | FW | COD | Elliot Grandin (from SM Caen) |
| — | FW | CIV | Bakari Koné (from OGC Nice) |
| — | FW | FRA | Mamadou Samassa (from Le Mans) |

Winter 08 Note: Flags indicate national team as defined under FIFA eligibility rules; some limited exceptions apply. Players may hold more than one non-FIFA nationality.

| No. | Pos. | Nation | Player |
|---|---|---|---|
| — | FW | BRA | Brandão (from Shakhtar Donetsk) |
| — | FW | FRA | Sylvain Wiltord (from Rennes) |

Out:

Summer 08 Note: Flags indicate national team as defined under FIFA eligibility rules; some limited exceptions apply. Players may hold more than one non-FIFA nationality.

| No. | Pos. | Nation | Player |
|---|---|---|---|
| — | GK | FRA | Cedric Carrasso (to Toulouse) |
| — | GK | FRA | Sébastien Hamel (to Toulouse) |
| — | MF | FRA | Samir Nasri (to Arsenal) €16m |
| — | FW | FRA | Djibril Cissé (on loan to Sunderland) |

Winter 08 Note: Flags indicate national team as defined under FIFA eligibility rules; some limited exceptions apply. Players may hold more than one non-FIFA nationality.

| No. | Pos. | Nation | Player |

== AS Monaco ==
In: Note: Flags indicate national team as defined under FIFA eligibility rules; some limited exceptions apply. Players may hold more than one non-FIFA nationality.

| No. | Pos. | Nation | Player |
|---|---|---|---|
| — | MF | CRO | Nikola Pokrivac (from Dinamo Zagreb) |
| — | MF | ARG | Sergio Bernardo Almiron (on loan from Juventus) |
| — | MF | USA | Freddy Adu (on loan from Benfica) |
| — | MF | CIV | Jean-Jacques Gosso (from F.C. Ashdod) |
| — | MF | NGA | Sani Kaita (from Sparta Rotterdam) |
| — | FW | KOR | Park Chu-Young (from FC Seoul) |
| — | DF | SUI | Patrick Müller (from Olympique Lyonnais) |

Out: Note: Flags indicate national team as defined under FIFA eligibility rules; some limited exceptions apply. Players may hold more than one non-FIFA nationality.

| No. | Pos. | Nation | Player |
|---|---|---|---|
| — | DF | FRA | Jérémy Berthod (to AJ Auxerre) |
| — | MF | FRA | Malaury Martin (on loan to Nîmes Olympique) |
| — | MF | FRA | Nenê (on loan to RCD Espanyol) |

== Nancy ==
In: Note: Flags indicate national team as defined under FIFA eligibility rules; some limited exceptions apply. Players may hold more than one non-FIFA nationality.

| No. | Pos. | Nation | Player |
|---|---|---|---|
| — | DF | FRA | Jean Calvé (from Le Mans) |
| — | DF | COD | Joël Sami (from Amiens) |
| — | MF | MAR | Abdeslam Ouaddou (from Valenciennes) |

Out: Note: Flags indicate national team as defined under FIFA eligibility rules; some limited exceptions apply. Players may hold more than one non-FIFA nationality.

| No. | Pos. | Nation | Player |

== Nantes ==
In: Note: Flags indicate national team as defined under FIFA eligibility rules; some limited exceptions apply. Players may hold more than one non-FIFA nationality.

| No. | Pos. | Nation | Player |
|---|---|---|---|
| — | MF | FRA | Djamel Abdoun (from AC Ajaccio) |
| — | GK | FRA | Jérôme Alonzo (free from PSG) |
| — | DF | FRA | Eric Cubilier (loan return from FC Metz) |
| — | MF | FRA | Sylvio Rodelin (from Rodez AF) |
| — | DF | FRA | Ibrahim Tall (from Heart of Midlothian F.C.) |
| 12 | FW | SRB | Filip Đorđević (from Red Star Belgrade) |
| — | DF | BRA | Douglão (from Sport Club Internacional) |
| — | DF | DEN | Michael Gravgaard (from FC Copenhagen) |

Out: Note: Flags indicate national team as defined under FIFA eligibility rules; some limited exceptions apply. Players may hold more than one non-FIFA nationality.

| No. | Pos. | Nation | Player |
|---|---|---|---|
| — | DF | ARG | Mauro Cetto (to Toulouse FC) |
| — | DF | MAD | Faneva Ima Andriantsima (loan to US Boulogne) |
| — | DF | FRA | Youssef Sekour (free transfer to CS Sedan) |
| — | DF | FRA | Olivier Thomas (Released) |
| — | MF | MAD | Paulin Voavy (loan to US Boulogne) |
| — | MF | GNB | Bocundji Cá (to Tours FC) |

== Nice ==
In: Note: Flags indicate national team as defined under FIFA eligibility rules; some limited exceptions apply. Players may hold more than one non-FIFA nationality.

| No. | Pos. | Nation | Player |
|---|---|---|---|
| — | DF | FRA | Gérald Cid (from Bolton Wanderers) |
| — | MF | CIV | Kafoumba Coulibaly (from Bastia) |
| — | MF | CIV | Emerse Fae (on loan from Reading) |
| — | FW | TUN | Chaouki Ben Saada (from Bastia) |
| — | MF | FRA | Loïc Remy (from Lyon) |

Out: Note: Flags indicate national team as defined under FIFA eligibility rules; some limited exceptions apply. Players may hold more than one non-FIFA nationality.

| No. | Pos. | Nation | Player |
|---|---|---|---|
| — | GK | FRA | Hugo Lloris (to Lyon) €8.5m |
| — | MF | BRA | Ederson (to Lyon) €15m |

== PSG ==
In: Note: Flags indicate national team as defined under FIFA eligibility rules; some limited exceptions apply. Players may hold more than one non-FIFA nationality.

| No. | Pos. | Nation | Player |
|---|---|---|---|
| — | MF | FRA | Ludovic Giuly (from Roma) |
| — | MF | FRA | Claude Makélélé (from Chelsea) |

Out: Note: Flags indicate national team as defined under FIFA eligibility rules; some limited exceptions apply. Players may hold more than one non-FIFA nationality.

| No. | Pos. | Nation | Player |
|---|---|---|---|
| — | DF | FRA | Bernard Mendy (free to Hull City) |
| — | MF | FRA | Didier Digard (to Middlesbrough) €5m |
| — | FW | FRA | David Ngog (to Liverpool) £1.5m |

== Rennes ==
In: Note: Flags indicate national team as defined under FIFA eligibility rules; some limited exceptions apply. Players may hold more than one non-FIFA nationality.

| No. | Pos. | Nation | Player |
|---|---|---|---|
| — | DF | USA | Carlos Bocanegra (free from Fulham) |
| — | DF | MLI | Djimi Traoré (on loan from Portsmouth) |
| — | FW | GHA | Asamoah Gyan (from Udinese) €8m |

Out: Note: Flags indicate national team as defined under FIFA eligibility rules; some limited exceptions apply. Players may hold more than one non-FIFA nationality.

| No. | Pos. | Nation | Player |
|---|---|---|---|
| — | GK | FRA | Benjamin Levacher (to La Vitréenne FC) |
| — | GK | FRA | Gabriel Trinquart (to Tour d'Auvergne Rennes) |
| — | DF | FRA | Romuald Marie (to AS Cannes) |
| — | DF | FRA | Fabian Medeiros (to Troyes AC) |
| — | DF | GHA | John Mensah (to Lyon) €8.4m |
| — | DF | FRA | Giovanni Oliveri (to Grenoble Foot 38) |
| — | DF | BEN | Achille Rouga (released) |
| — | MF | FRA | Etienne Didot (to FC Toulouse) €3m |
| — | MF | FRA | Guillaume Heinry (to La Vitréenne FC) |
| — | MF | FRA | Mathieu Le Roux (to Vannes OC) |
| — | MF | FRA | Vincent Mesquita (to Troyes AC) |
| — | MF | FRA | Kévin Salabiaku (to AS Saint-Étienne) |
| — | FW | GUI | Mohamed Jallow (released) |

== Sochaux ==
In: Note: Flags indicate national team as defined under FIFA eligibility rules; some limited exceptions apply. Players may hold more than one non-FIFA nationality.

| No. | Pos. | Nation | Player |
|---|---|---|---|
| — | FW | CIV | Kandia Traoré (from Al Nasr) |

Out: Note: Flags indicate national team as defined under FIFA eligibility rules; some limited exceptions apply. Players may hold more than one non-FIFA nationality.

| No. | Pos. | Nation | Player |
|---|---|---|---|
| — | DF | FRA | Jeremie Brechet (free to PSV) |

== Saint-Étienne ==
In:

Summer 08 Note: Flags indicate national team as defined under FIFA eligibility rules; some limited exceptions apply. Players may hold more than one non-FIFA nationality.

| No. | Pos. | Nation | Player |
|---|---|---|---|
| — | MF | JPN | Daisuke Matsui (from Le Mans) |
| — | MF | POR | Paulo Machado (on loan from Porto) |

Out:

Summer 08 Note: Flags indicate national team as defined under FIFA eligibility rules; some limited exceptions apply. Players may hold more than one non-FIFA nationality.

| No. | Pos. | Nation | Player |
|---|---|---|---|
| — | MF | COL | Freddy Guarin (to Porto) |

== Toulouse ==
In: Note: Flags indicate national team as defined under FIFA eligibility rules; some limited exceptions apply. Players may hold more than one non-FIFA nationality.

| No. | Pos. | Nation | Player |
|---|---|---|---|
| — | GK | FRA | Cedric Carrasso (from Marseille) |
| — | DF | BRA | Eduardo Ratinho (on loan from Corinthians) |
| — | MF | FRA | Etienne Didot (from Rennes) €3m |
| — | MF | NOR | Daniel Braaten (from Bolton Wanderers) |

Out: Note: Flags indicate national team as defined under FIFA eligibility rules; some limited exceptions apply. Players may hold more than one non-FIFA nationality.

| No. | Pos. | Nation | Player |
|---|---|---|---|
| — | MF | CMR | Achille Emaná (to Real Betis) £5.5m |
| — | FW | SWE | Johan Elmander (to Bolton) £8.2m |

== Valenciennes ==
In: Note: Flags indicate national team as defined under FIFA eligibility rules; some limited exceptions apply. Players may hold more than one non-FIFA nationality.

| No. | Pos. | Nation | Player |
|---|---|---|---|
| — | GK | FRA | Jean-Louis Leca (from SC Bastia) |
| — | MF | FRA | Gael Danic (from Rennes) |
| — | FW | SVK | Filip Sebo (from Rangers) £1m |

Out: Note: Flags indicate national team as defined under FIFA eligibility rules; some limited exceptions apply. Players may hold more than one non-FIFA nationality.

| No. | Pos. | Nation | Player |
|---|---|---|---|
| — | MF | MAR | Abdeslam Ouaddou (to AS Nancy) |
| — | FW | FRA | Steve Savidan (to SM Caen) |
