= Levrat =

Levrat is a surname. Notable people with the surname include:

- Christian Levrat (born 1970), Swiss politician
- Fabrice Levrat (born 1979), French football player
