= Parseval =

Parseval is a surname. Notable persons with the surname include:

- Marc-Antoine Parseval (1755–1836), French mathematician
- August von Parseval (1861–1942), German airship designer
- Quentin de Parseval (born 1987), French footballer

== See also ==
- François-Auguste Parseval-Grandmaison (1759–1834), French poet
- Alexandre Ferdinand Parseval-Deschenes (1790–1860), French admiral and senator
