= Abdoulaye Baldé =

Abdoulaye Baldé may refer to:

- Abdoulaye Baldé (footballer) (born 1986), French footballer
- Abdoulaye Baldé (politician) (born 1964), Senegalese politician
