= Louis Finot =

Louis Finot may refer to:

- Louis Finot (archeologist) (1864–1935), French archeologist
- Louis Finot (footballer) (1909–1996), French soccer player
