= Vairelles =

Vairelles is a surname. Notable people with the surname include:

- David Vairelles (born 1977), French footballer, cousin of Tony
- Tony Vairelles (born 1973), French footballer
