= Youssouf Mulumbu =

Congolese footballer (born 1987)

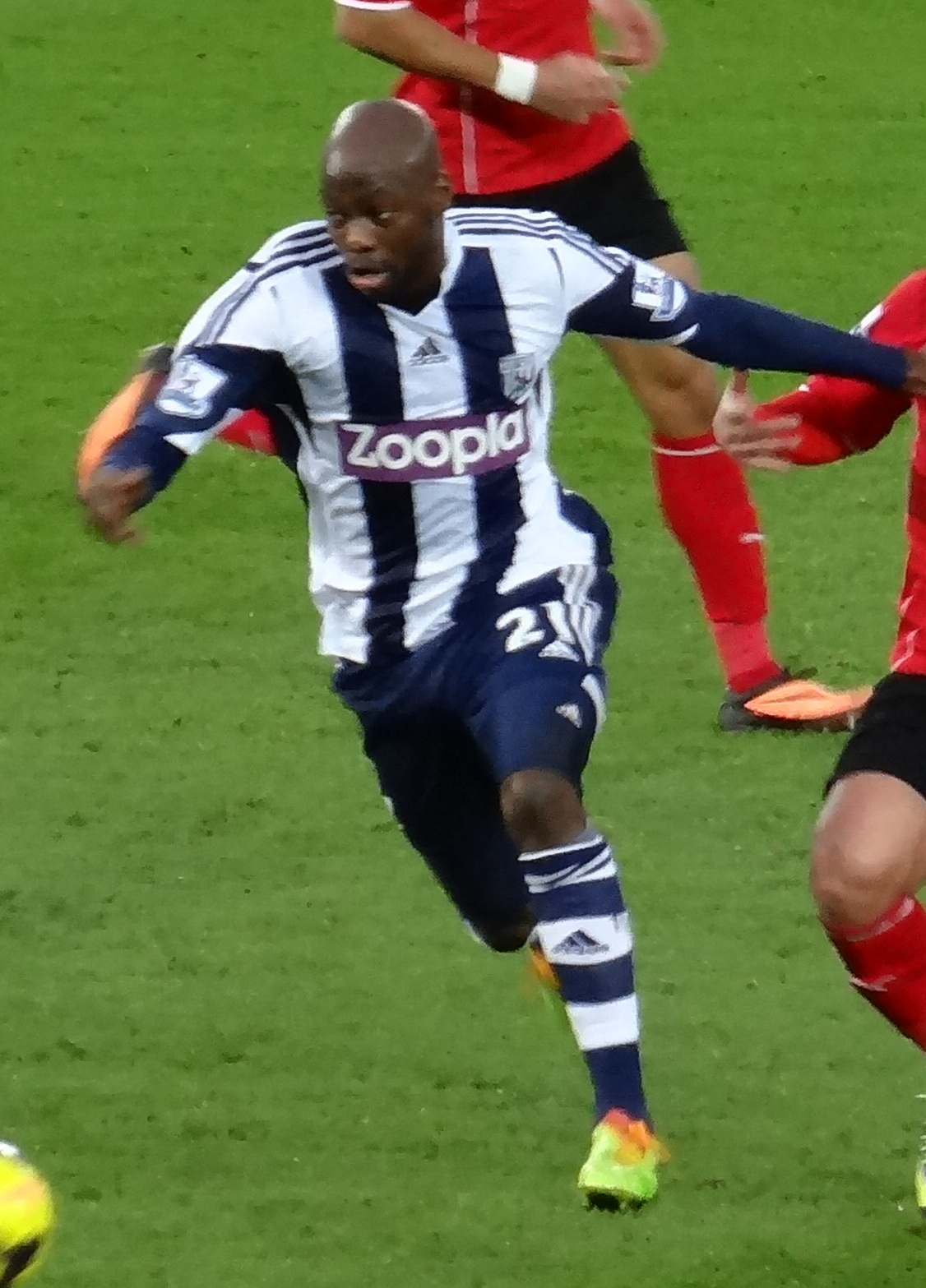
- Mulumbu playing for West Bromwich Albion in 2013

Personal information
- Full name: Nganguyousuf Mulumbu
- Date of birth: 25 January 1987 (age 39)
- Place of birth: Kinshasa, Zaire
- Height: 1.77 m (5 ft 10 in)
- Position: Midfielder

Youth career
- 2004–2006: Paris Saint-Germain

Senior career*
Years	Team	Apps	(Gls)
2004–2009	Paris Saint-Germain B	50	(1)
2006–2009	Paris Saint-Germain	13	(0)
2007–2008	→ Amiens (loan)	23	(1)
2009	→ West Bromwich Albion (loan)	6	(0)
2009–2015	West Bromwich Albion	191	(15)
2015–2017	Norwich City	20	(0)
2017–2018	Kilmarnock	18	(1)
2018–2019	Celtic	1	(0)
2019	→ Kilmarnock (loan)	7	(1)
2020–2021	Kilmarnock	18	(0)
2021–2022	Saint-Éloi Lupopo	37	(16)
2023–2024	Orléans	0	(0)
2023–2024	Orléans B	2	(0)
Total		386	

International career
2007	France U21	1	(0)
2008–2019	DR Congo	45	(1)
- * Club domestic league appearances and goals

Nganguyousuf Mulumbu (born 25 January 1987) is a Congolese former professional footballer who played as a midfielder.

Mulumbu came through Paris Saint-Germain's youth academy. He began playing for Paris Saint-Germain B in 2004 and was promoted to the first-team in 2006. He was sent on two loan deals to Amiens and West Bromwich Albion, respectively, ultimately signing a permanent deal with the latter. He played there several years, winning the club's player of the year award for 2011. In 2015, he moved to newly promoted Premier League club Norwich City, and he played for Scottish clubs Celtic and Kilmarnock between 2017 and 2021. Afterwards, he returned to Congo to play for Saint-Éloi Lupopo. In 2023 he signed for French team US Orleans and retired the next year.

Born in Kinshasa, Zaire, but growing up in France, Mulumbu represented France at various youth levels, before making his international debut in 2008 aged 21. He shortly withdrew from the national team citing a "lack of professionalism" in 2009. He returned in 2012, and helped the team finish in third place during the 2015 Africa Cup of Nations.

== Early life ==
Mulumbu was born in Kinshasa, Zaire, to parents born in Léopoldville, Belgian Congo, in the late 1950s.

He moved to France in the late 1980s with his family, and grew up in the town of Épinay-sous-Sénart, a suburb of Paris. He acquired French nationality on 10 April 2001, through the collective effect of his parents' naturalization.

== Club career ==
=== Paris Saint-Germain ===
Mulumbu began playing for the Paris Saint-Germain Academy at age 13. On 22 October 2006, he made his Ligue 1 debut under head coach Guy Lacombe, at 19 years and 10 months in a match against Auxerre. He signed his first professional contract with Paris Saint-Germain on 13 November 2006.

During the 2007–08 season, he was on loan at Amiens in Ligue 2, scoring once in 29 appearances.

=== West Bromwich Albion ===
It was reported by the French media on 26 January 2009 that he joined Premier League team West Bromwich Albion on a trial basis. On 2 February 2009, the January transfer deadline day, he joined them on loan with a view to a permanent deal at the end of the season. Mulumbu's first term at The Hawthorns was interrupted by injuries and he had to wait until April to make his Premier League debut, coming on as a sub in a 2–2 draw at Portsmouth. He signed for West Brom permanently on a one-year contract for a fee of £175,000 on 10 July 2009.

He was named West Brom's Player of the Year by both the club and the fans at the end of the season, and signed his third contract extension in 13 months on 25 July 2011, tying himself to the club until 2015 (with the option of an extra year).

On 15 March 2014, Mulumbu scored a crucial winner for West Brom in a 2–1 victory against Swansea City at the Liberty Stadium, giving Pepe Mel his first win as head coach.

=== Norwich City ===
In June 2015, it was announced that Mulumbu would sign on a free transfer for newly promoted Norwich City on 1 July 2015.

On 3 August 2015, Norwich announced that Mulumbu suffered a broken metatarsal in a friendly against Brentford which would require surgery and sideline him for several weeks, ruling him out of the start of the season. He would finally make his debut on 27 October in a League Cup game against Everton, which Norwich lost on penalties after a 1–1 draw. He made his Premier League debut a few days later on 31 October in a 2–1 defeat to Manchester City. However, with Jonny Howson, Alexander Tettey and Graham Dorrans preferred in the centre of midfield, Mulumbu would ultimately be confined to only five league starts and two appearances as a substitute in the 2015–16 season, plus one appearance in the FA Cup, and the season would end with Norwich relegated back to the Championship.

Mulumbu remained with Norwich for the 2016–17 season but again found his opportunities for first team action restricted. His last appearance for Norwich came on 11 February 2017 in a 5–1 win over Nottingham Forest. On 2 May, it was announced that Mulumbu was one of seven players who would be released by Norwich when their contracts expired at the end of the season.

=== Kilmarnock ===
On 22 November 2017, it was announced that Mulumbu had signed for Scottish Premiership club Kilmarnock until the end of the 2017–18 season. Mulumbu reunited with manager Steve Clarke, who had also managed him at West Bromwich. He scored his first goal for Kilmarnock in a 1–0 win against Celtic on 3 February 2018. On 13 July 2018, Clarke said that Mulumbu had left Kilmarnock and was not expected to return to the club.

=== Celtic ===
On 31 August 2018, Mulumbu signed a two-year deal with Celtic. Mulumbu was loaned back to Kilmarnock on 31 January 2019, until the end of the 2018–19 season, and played 12 times in his second spell with the Ayrshire club. In June 2019, Mulumbu left Celtic after the club activated a break clause in his contract. Mulumbu had made three appearances for the Glasgow side.

=== Return to Kilmarnock ===
After a year out of football, Mulumbu trained with Kilmarnock during August 2020. On 28 August, he made his return to the club on a six-month deal. On 11 January 2021, Mulumbu agreed a contract extension to remain at the club until the end of the 2020–21 season. He left Kilmarnock in May 2021 to move to France.

=== Saint-Éloi Lupopo ===
On 31 July 2021, Mulumbu signed a one-year contract with Saint-Éloi Lupopo, marking his return to Congo. He left the club as his contract expired in August 2022, after finishing third in the national championship and putting in strong performances as a key player in the team.

=== Orléans ===
On 21 September 2023, French Championnat National club Orléans signed Mulumbu to a one-year contract. He suffered an injury during practice shortly after joining, delaying his debut.

== International career ==
Mulumbu was formerly a member of the France under-20 and under-21 teams. He earned his first cap for Congo DR national team against Algeria on 26 March 2008. In 2009, Mulumbu decided to boycott international football after he claimed his national team lacked professionalism. On 23 September 2011, he retired from international duties, quoting "numerous problems we were facing with some authorities within the DR Congo Football Federation". However, in July 2012, he decided to revoke this decision, and made himself available for the Congo DR national team once again.

== Personal life ==
Mulumbu is a Muslim.

== Career statistics ==
=== Club ===
Appearances and goals by club, season and competition
Club	Season	League			National cup (Note: Includes Coupe de France, FA Cup, Scottish FA Cup)		League cup (Note: Includes Coupe de la Ligue, Football League Cup, Scottish League Cup)		Other		Total	
Club	Season	Division	Apps	Goals	Apps	Goals	Apps	Goals	Apps	Goals	Apps	Goals
Paris Saint-Germain B	2004–05	CFA	6	1	–		–		–		6	1
Paris Saint-Germain B	2005–06	CFA	21	0	–		–		–		21	0
Paris Saint-Germain B	2006–07	CFA	12	0	–		–		–		12	0
Paris Saint-Germain B	2007–08	CFA	0	0	–		–		–		0	0
Paris Saint-Germain B	2008–09	CFA	11	0	–		–		–		11	0
Paris Saint-Germain B	Total		50	1	–		–		–		50	1
Paris Saint-Germain	2006–07	Ligue 1	12	0	0	0	0	0	0	0	12	0
Paris Saint-Germain	2007–08	Ligue 1	1	0	0	0	0	0	0	0	1	0
Paris Saint-Germain	2008–09	Ligue 1	0	0	0	0	0	0	2 (Note: Appearances in UEFA Cup)	0	2	0
Paris Saint-Germain	Total		13	0	0	0	0	0	2	0	15	0
Amiens SC (loan)	2007–08	Ligue 2	23	1	0	0	0	0	–		23	1
West Bromwich Albion	2008–09	Premier League	6	0	0	0	0	0	–		6	0
West Bromwich Albion	2009–10	Championship	40	3	4	0	2	0	–		46	3
West Bromwich Albion	2010–11	Premier League	34	7	0	0	0	0	–		34	7
West Bromwich Albion	2011–12	Premier League	35	1	1	0	0	0	–		36	1
West Bromwich Albion	2012–13	Premier League	28	2	0	0	2	0	–		30	2
West Bromwich Albion	2013–14	Premier League	37	2	0	0	1	0	–		38	2
West Bromwich Albion	2014–15	Premier League	17	0	1	0	3	0	–		21	0
West Bromwich Albion	Total		197	15	6	0	8	0	–		211	15
Norwich City	2015–16	Premier League	7	0	1	0	1	0	–		9	0
Norwich City	2016–17	Championship	13	0	0	0	1	0	1 (Note: Appearance for Norwich City under-23s in EFL Trophy)	0	15	0
Norwich City	Total		20	0	1	0	2	0	1	0	24	0
Kilmarnock	2017–18	Scottish Premiership	18	1	2	0	0	0	–		20	1
Celtic	2018–19	Scottish Premiership	1	0	0	0	0	0	2 (Note: Appearances in UEFA Europa League)	0	3	0
Kilmarnock (loan)	2018–19	Scottish Premiership	10	1	2	0	0	0	–		12	1
Kilmarnock	2020–21	Scottish Premiership	16	0	2	0	2	0	–		20	0
Saint-Éloi Lupopo	2021–22	Linafoot	37	16							37	16
Career total			385	35	13	0	12	0	5	0	415	35

=== International ===
Appearances and goals by national team and year
National team	Year	Apps	Goals
DR Congo	2008	9	0
DR Congo	2009	1	0
DR Congo	2010	2	0
DR Congo	2011	2	0
DR Congo	2012	2	1
DR Congo	2013	7	0
DR Congo	2014	5	0
DR Congo	2015	7	0
DR Congo	2016	1	0
DR Congo	2017	3	0
DR Congo	2018	1	0
DR Congo	2019	5	0
Total		45	1

Scores and results list DR Congo's goal tally first, score column indicates score after each Mulumbu goal.

List of international goals scored by Youssouf Mulumbu
No.	Date	Venue	Opponent	Score	Result	Competition	Ref.
1	14 October 2012	Estadio de Malabo, Malabo, Equatorial Guinea	Equatorial Guinea	1–2	1–2	2013 Africa Cup of Nations qualification	

== Honours ==
DR Congo

- Africa Cup of Nations bronze: 2015
