= David Hamed =

French footballer (born 1974)

Personal information
- Full name: David Hamed
- Date of birth: 2 August 1974 (age 52)
- Place of birth: Marseille, France
- Height: 1.80 m (5 ft 11 in)
- Position: Defender

Senior career*
Years	Team	Apps	(Gls)
1991–1992	Montpellier B		
1992–1996	Istres	82	(7)
1996–1998	Amiens	75	(4)
1998–2003	Troyes AC	157	(6)
2003–2006	Istres	83	(1)
2006	Sedan	3	(0)
2007–2008	Amiens	38	(1)
2009–2010	Amiens	27	(1)
Total		465	(20)
- * Club domestic league appearances and goals

David Hamed (born 2 August 1974) is a French former professional footballer. He last played in the Championnat National as a defender for Amiens SC. He also holds Algerian citizenship.

Hamed played at the professional level in Ligue 1 for Troyes AC, FC Istres and CS Sedan Ardennes and in Ligue 2 for FC Istres, Amiens SC, Troyes AC and FC Istres. With Troyes AC, he played 4 games in the 2001–02 UEFA Cup, scoring one goal. Troyes qualified by being one of the winners of the 2001 UEFA Intertoto Cup.

== Honours ==
Troyes AC

- UEFA Intertoto Cup: 2001
