= Cyrille Merville =

French footballer (born 1982)

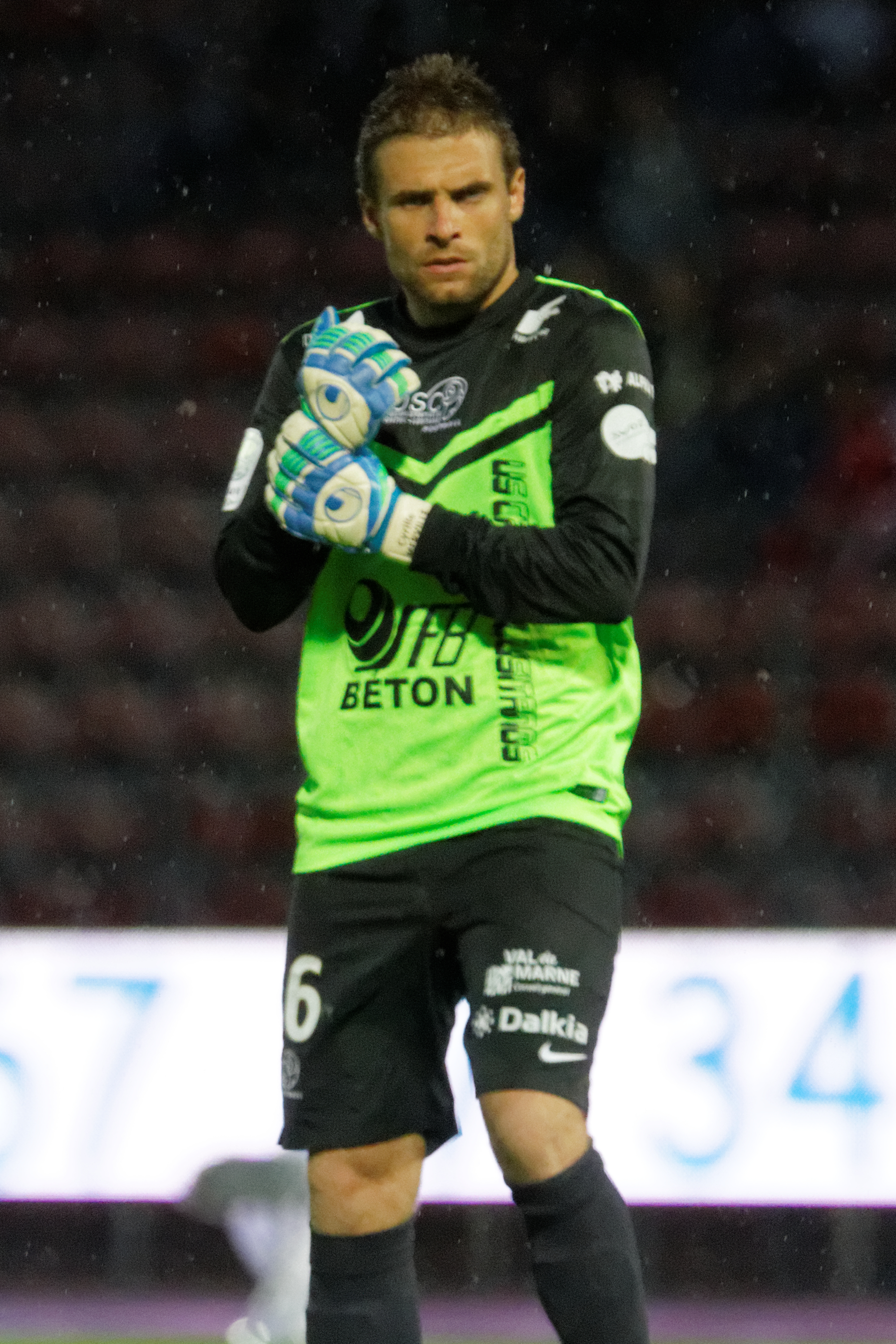

Personal information
- Date of birth: 14 April 1982 (age 44)
- Place of birth: Amiens, France
- Height: 1.80 m (5 ft 11 in)
- Position: Goalkeeper

Senior career*
Years	Team	Apps	(Gls)
1999–2007	Amiens	155	(0)
2007–2009	Troyes	75	(0)
2009–2011	Arles-Avignon	57	(0)
2011–2014	Nîmes	95	(0)
2014–2016	Créteil	19	(0)
2016–2018	Valenciennes	7	(0)
Total		403	(0)
- * Club domestic league appearances and goals

Cyrille Merville (born 14 April 1982) is a French football goalkeeper.

== Career ==
Merville was born in Amiens, France. He signed for then-Ligue 1 side AC Arles-Avignon in the summer of 2009 from Troyes AC.

In June 2014, he signed a two-year contract with US Créteil-Lusitanos.

== Career statistics ==
=== Club ===
Appearances and goals by club, season and competition
Club	Season	League			National cup		League cup		Total	
Club	Season	Division	Apps	Goals	Apps	Goals	Apps	Goals	Apps	Goals
Amiens	1999–2000	Division 2	0	0	1	0	0	0	1	0
Amiens	2000–01	National	0	0	0	0	0	0	0	0
Amiens	2001–02	Division 2	1	0	0	0	0	0	1	0
Amiens	2002–03	Ligue 2	10	0	2	0	1	0	13	0
Amiens	2003–04	Ligue 2	38	0	5	0	1	0	44	0
Amiens	2004–05	Ligue 2	37	0	0	0	1	0	38	0
Amiens	2005–06	Ligue 2	31	0	0	0	0	0	31	0
Amiens	2006–07	Ligue 2	38	0	3	0	0	0	41	0
Amiens	Total		155	0	11	0	3	0	169	0
Troyes	2007–08	Ligue 2	37	0	1	0	0	0	38	0
Troyes	2008–09	Ligue 2	38	0	0	0	0	0	38	0
Troyes	Total		75	0	1	0	0	0	76	0
Arles-Avignon	2009–10	Ligue 2	38	0	1	0	0	0	39	0
Arles-Avignon	2010–11	Ligue 1	19	0	0	0	1	0	20	0
Arles-Avignon	Total		57	0	1	0	1	0	59	0
Nîmes	2011–12	National	23	0	2	0	—		25	0
Nîmes	2012–13	Ligue 2	36	0	3	0	1	0	40	0
Nîmes	2013–14	Ligue 2	36	0	0	0	0	0	36	0
Nîmes	Total		95	0	5	0	1	0	101	0
Créteil	2014–15	Ligue 2	16	0	1	0	1	0	18	0
Créteil	2015–16	Ligue 2	3	0	1	0	1	0	5	0
Créteil	Total		19	0	2	0	2	0	23	0
Valenciennes	2016–17	Ligue 2	3	0	2	0	0	0	5	0
Valenciennes	2017–18	Ligue 2	4	0	2	0	3	0	9	0
Valenciennes	Total		7	0	4	0	3	0	14	0
Career total			403	0	24	0	10	0	437	0
