= Jean-Philippe Faure =

French footballer (born 1966)

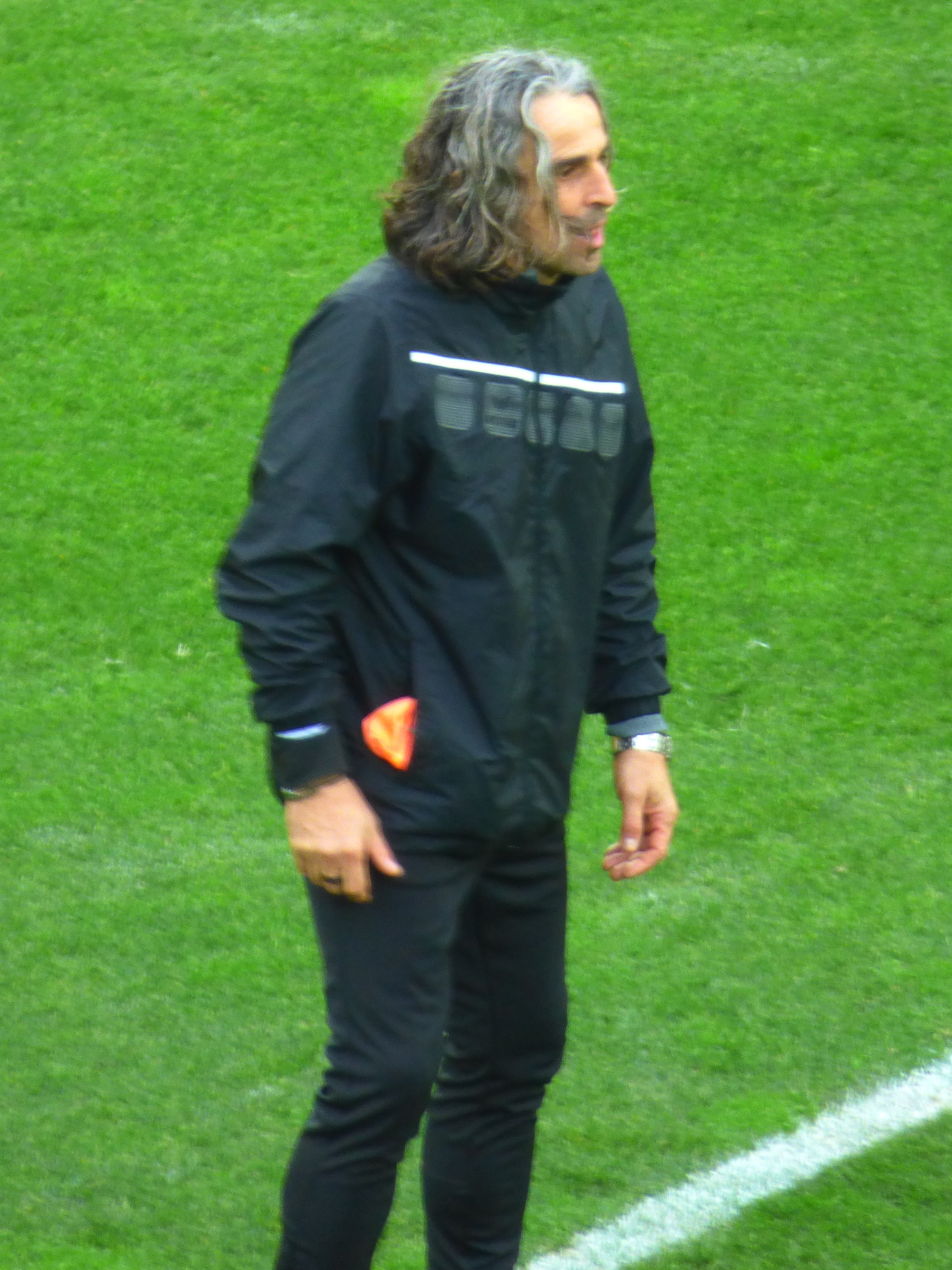
- Faure with Niort in 2019

Personal information
- Date of birth: 17 November 1966 (age 59)
- Place of birth: Vernoux, France
- Height: 1.76 m (5 ft 9 in)
- Position: Midfielder

Senior career*
Years	Team	Apps	(Gls)
1984–1987	Thonon-les-Bains	42	(1)
1987–1989	Le Puy	49	(1)
1989–1992	Alès	67	(1)
1992–1993	Troyes	16	(4)
1993–1998	Chamois Niortais	176	(9)
1998–2000	Sedan	31	(0)
2000–2002	Scarborough	34	(0)
Total		415	(16)

Managerial career
- 2003–2010: Thouars
- 2010–2011: La Roche-sur-Yon
- 2016: Chamois Niortais (interim)
- 2018–2019: Chamois Niortais (interim)
- * Club domestic league appearances and goals

Jean-Philippe Faure (born 17 November 1966) is a football manager and former player who played as an attacking midfielder.

Since his retirement from playing in 2002, Faure has worked as a coach and manager. He managed French lower league clubs Thouars and La Roche. From March to May 2016 he served as interim manager of Ligue 2 side Chamois Niortais alongside Carl Tourenne, a role he again took up between December 2018 and January 2019.
