= 1926–27 French Amateur Football Championship =

French Amateur Football Championship
- Season: 1926–27

Statistics of the French Amateur Football Championship in the 1926-27 season. The Championship was the main competition for the amateur football clubs from 1926 to 1929. There were 3 divisions: Excellence, Honor and Promotion.

== Excellence Division ==
1. CA Paris 4 2 2 0 6
2. Amiens AC 4 2 1 1 5
3. Olympique de Marseille 4 1 2 1 4
4. SC de la Bastidienne (Bordeaux) 4 1 1 2 8-12 3
5. FC Rouennais 4 0 2 2 2

== Honour Division ==
1. AS Valentigney 3 2 1 0 10- 4 5
2. RC Strasbourg 3 2 0 1 11- 7 4
3. CA Messin 3 2 0 1 9- 8 4
4. SC Reims 3 1 1 1 3- 6 3
5. CO Saint-Chamond 4 0 0 4 7-15 0
