= Omar Daf =

Senegalese footballer and manager (born 1977)

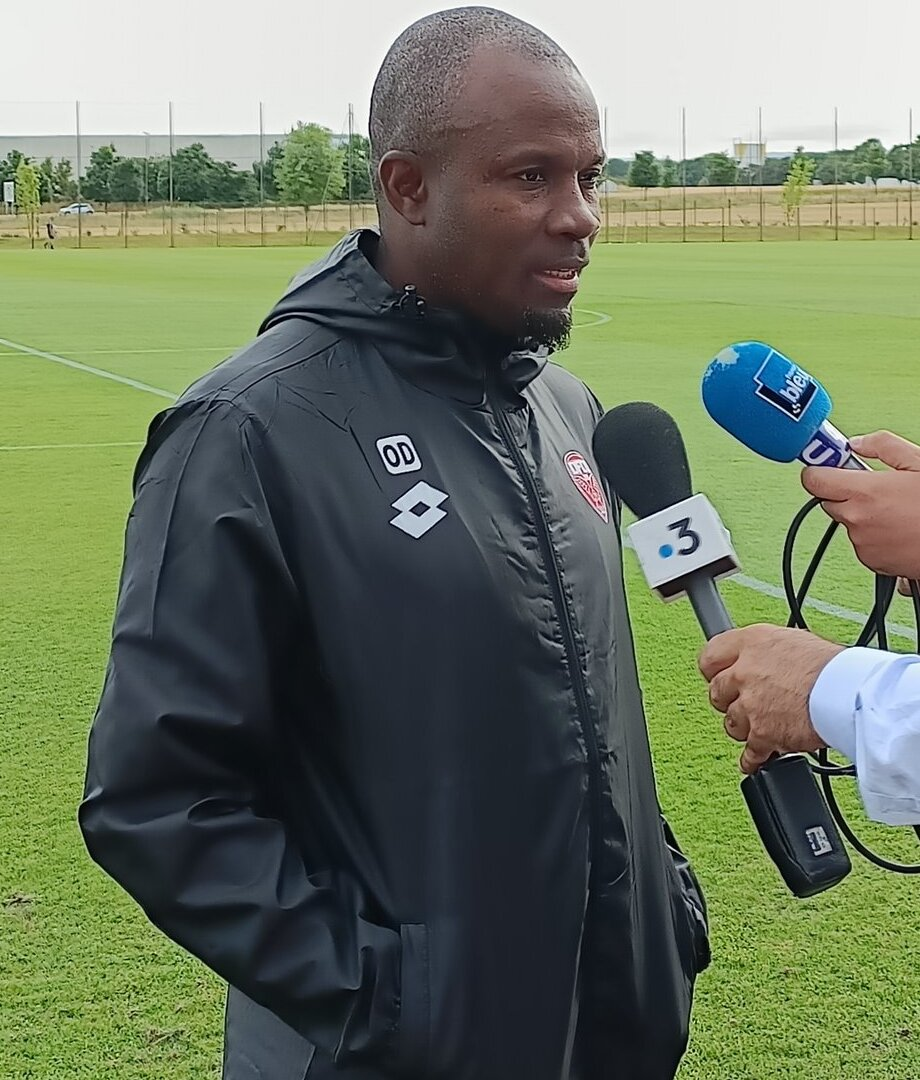

Personal information
- Date of birth: 12 February 1977 (age 49)
- Place of birth: Dakar, Senegal
- Height: 1.77 m (5 ft 10 in)
- Position: Defender

Youth career
- –1995: US Gorée

Senior career*
Years	Team	Apps	(Gls)
1995–1996	Westerlo	2	(0)
1996–1997	Thonon-Chablais	4	(0)
1997–2009	Sochaux	188	(0)
2009–2012	Brest	78	(1)
2012–2013	Sochaux	5	(0)
Total		277	(1)

International career
1998–2012	Senegal	55	(0)

Managerial career
- 2018–2022: Sochaux
- 2022–2023: Dijon
- 2023–2026: Amiens
- * Club domestic league appearances and goals

Omar Daf (born 12 February 1977) is a Senegalese football manager and former player who last managed Ligue 3 club Amiens. A Senegal international with French nationality, Daf represented his country at the 2002 FIFA World Cup. He played as a full-back, but could also play at centre-back.

== Club career ==
Born in Dakar, Daf began playing football with US Gorée. At age 17, a Belgian football scout, Karel Brokken, recruited him to Belgian Second Division side K.V.C. Westerlo, where he began his professional career. A year later, Daf joined French Championnat National 2 side Thonon-Chablais, before embarking on a 12-year spell with Sochaux in 1997.

== Managerial career ==
In November 2018, Daf became manager of Sochaux. In January 2019, he extended his contract until 2021.

In June 2023, Daf was appointed as the manager of Ligue 2 club Amiens.

== Honours ==
Senegal

- Africa Cup of Nations runner-up: 2002
