= Carl Tourenne =

French footballer (born 1972)

Personal information
- Date of birth: 10 June 1972 (age 54)
- Place of birth: Ruffec, France
- Height: 1.81 m (5 ft 11 in)
- Position: Defensive midfielder

Youth career
- 1989–1991: Chamois Niortais

Senior career*
Years	Team	Apps	(Gls)
1991–1993	Angoulême	51	(0)
1993–1996	Valenciennes	73	(6)
1996–1997	Poitiers	31	(1)
1997–2000	Lille	94	(2)
2000–2006	Troyes	168	(2)
2006–2008	Reims	40	(2)
2008–2009	Amiens	45	(1)
2009–2011	Chamois Niortais	46	(1)
Total		548	(15)

Managerial career
- 2016: Chamois Niortais (interim)
- * Club domestic league appearances and goals

Carl Tourenne (born 10 June 1972) is a French former professional footballer who played as a defensive midfielder.

== Career ==
In the 2001–02 season, Tourenne played two matches in the UEFA Cup with Troyes. He re-signed for his first club, Chamois Niortais, on 29 July 2009. Tourenne retired from football at the end of the 2010–11 season at the age of 39, having played 548 league matches in his career.

From March 2016 to May 2016, he was interim manager of Chamois Niortais, playing in the Championnat de France amateur Group C side, alongside Jean-Philippe Faure.

== Honours ==
Lille

- Ligue 2: 1999–2000

Troyes

- Intertoto Cup: 2001
