= Ablaï Baldé =

French footballer (born 1986)

Personal information
- Full name: Ablaï Baldé
- Date of birth: 30 November 1986 (age 39)
- Place of birth: Paris, France
- Height: 1.86 m (6 ft 1 in)
- Position: Striker

Team information
- Current team: Vendée Luçon Football

Senior career*
| Years | Team | Apps | (Gls) |
| 2004–2009 | Amiens SC | 86 | (17) |
| 2007–2008 | → FC Metz (loan) | 3 | (0) |
| 2009–2012 | LB Châteauroux | 27 | (1) |
| 2010 | → Hatta Club (loan) | - | (-) |
| 2012 | AC Lumezzane | 9 | (0) |
| 2012–2014 | Étoile Fréjus Saint-Raphaël | 48 | (16) |
| 2014–2015 | Paris FC | 32 | (4) |
| 2015– | Vendée Luçon Football | 9 | (1) |

International career
| 2005 | France U-19 | 5 | (4) |
| 2006 | France U-20 | - | (-) |
- * Club domestic league appearances and goals as of January 27, 2016

Ablaï Baldé (born 30 November 1986) is a French professional footballer who currently plays as a striker for Vendée Luçon Football.

== Personal life ==
Baldé holds French and Senegalese nationalities. He is the brother of the footballer Ibrahima Baldé.
