= Stéphane Hernandez =

French footballer (born 1979)

Personal information
- Date of birth: August 24, 1979 (age 47)
- Place of birth: Échirolles, France
- Height: 1.82 m (6 ft 0 in)
- Position: Defender

Team information
- Current team: AS Savigneux-Montbrison (head coach)

Youth career
- Saint-Étienne

Senior career*
Years	Team	Apps	(Gls)
1996–2005	Saint-Étienne B	83	(1)
1997–2005	Saint-Étienne	114	(3)
2005–2008	Amiens	52	(0)
2008	Vannes	0	(0)
2009	Evian		
2010	Aurillac	15	(1)
2010–2013	Chambéry		

Managerial career
- 2018–: AS Savigneux-Montbrison
- * Club domestic league appearances and goals

Stéphane Hernandez (born 24 August 1979) is a French football manager and former player who played as a defender. As of 2021, he is the head coach of AS Savigneux-Montbrison.

== Personal life ==
Born in France, Hernandez is of Spanish descent.
