= Boris Ponge =

French footballer (born 1985)

Personal information
- Date of birth: June 3, 1985 (age 41)
- Place of birth: Alès, France
- Height: 1.82 m (5 ft 11 1/2 in)
- Position: Midfielder

Team information
- Current team: FC Martigues

Senior career*
Years	Team	Apps	(Gls)
2003–2005	Lyon (B team)		
2005–2006	Dijon FCO	21	(0)
2007–2008	Clermont Foot	25	(3)
2008–2010	AS Beauvais		
2010–	FC Martigues	21	(4)
- * Club domestic league appearances and goals as of 22:10, 16 November 2011 (UTC)

Boris Ponge (born June 3, 1985) is a French professional football player. Currently, he plays in the Championnat National for FC Martigues.

He played on the professional level in Ligue 2 for Dijon FCO and Clermont Foot.
