= Thomas Deruda =

French footballer (born 1986)

Personal information
- Date of birth: 13 July 1986 (age 40)
- Place of birth: Marseille, France
- Height: 1.83 m (6 ft 0 in)
- Position: Right midfielder

Youth career
- Olympique de Marseille

Senior career*
Years	Team	Apps	(Gls)
2005–2009	Olympique de Marseille	5	(0)
2007	→ FC Libourne-Saint-Seurin (loan)	10	(0)
2007–2008	→ Amiens SC (loan)	1	(0)
2008	→ CF Badalona (loan)		
2008–2009	Montpellier HSC	16	(1)
2009–2010	AC Ajaccio	13	(0)
2010–2011	GFCO Ajaccio	15	(0)
2011–2012	AC Arles-Avignon	2	(0)
- * Club domestic league appearances and goals as of 11 May 2012

Thomas Deruda (born 13 July 1986) is a French footballer who played as a midfielder in Ligue 1 for Olympique de Marseille and in Ligue 2 for FC Libourne-Saint-Seurin, Amiens SC, Montpellier HSC, AC Ajaccio and AC Arles-Avignon.
