= Foued Kadir =

Footballer (born 1983)

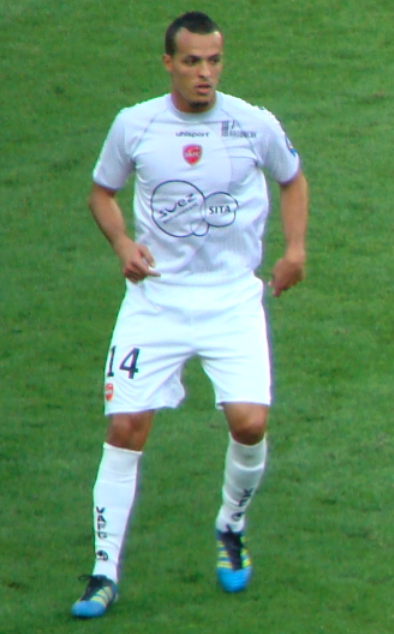
- Kadir with Valenciennes in 2011

Personal information
- Full name: Foued Kadir
- Date of birth: 5 December 1983 (age 42)
- Place of birth: Martigues, France
- Height: 1.80 m (5 ft 11 in)
- Position: Attacking midfielder

Team information
- Current team: AC Arlésien

Youth career
- 2000–2002: Martigues
- 2002–2003: Troyes

Senior career*
Years	Team	Apps	(Gls)
2003–2007	Cannes	79	(9)
2007–2009	Amiens	67	(6)
2009–2013	Valenciennes	82	(15)
2013–2015	Marseille	15	(0)
2013–2014	→ Rennes (loan)	28	(6)
2014–2015	→ Real Betis (loan)	24	(1)
2015–2016	Real Betis	8	(0)
2016–2017	Getafe	6	(0)
2017–2018	Alcorcón	31	(1)
2018–2024	Martigues	70	(18)
2024–2026	Istres	48	(2)
2026–	AC Arlésien	0	(0)

International career
2010–2015	Algeria	25	(2)
- * Club domestic league appearances and goals as of 22:32, 5 February 2025 (UTC)

Foued Kadir (born 5 December 1983) is a professional footballer who plays as an attacking midfielder for AC Arlésien.

Born in France, Kadir was a member of the Algeria national team at the 2010 Africa Cup of Nations and the 2010 FIFA World Cup. He scored two goals in twenty-five games for Algeria.

== Club career ==
Born in Martigues, Kadir began his career in the youth ranks of his hometown club, Martigues. At the age of 18, after numerous problems during his time with the club, he contemplated quitting football to become a police officer. After leaving the club, he played briefly for two amateur sides, AS Gignac and Stade Beaucairois, before joining Troyes' reserve team. After a season and a half with Troyes, he joined Championnat National side Cannes where he would spend the next three seasons.

In June 2007, Kadir went on trial with Ligue 2 side Amiens. In July 2009, he started training with Valenciennes of Ligue 1 and two weeks later signed a two-year contract with the club.

On 2 January 2013, Kadir moved to Marseille for a transfer fee €500,000, signing a three-and-a-half-year contract with the club. He was subsequently loaned to Rennes and Real Betis, signing an obligatory permanent contract with the latter after its promotion to La Liga.

On 31 August 2016, free agent Kadir signed for Getafe. The following 5 January, he moved to fellow league team Alcorcón.

As of 2026, at the age of 42, Kadir continued his playing career in the Championnat National 2, playing for Istres FC. During the 2026 FIFA World Cup, he also served as a media pundit, providing tactical analysis on the Algerian national team and expressing optimism about their chances in the tournament.

== International career ==
Kadir was called up to the Algeria U23 national team for a training camp in France. He was named in the preliminary squad for Algeria's 2010 World Cup campaign. On 28 May 2010, Kadir made his debut for the Algeria national team in a friendly against the Republic of Ireland.

== Career statistics ==
Goal	Date	Venue	Opponent	Result	Competition
1.	9 October 2011	Stade 5 Juillet 1962, Algiers, Algeria	Central African Republic	2–0	2012 Africa Cup of Nations qualification
2.	15 June 2012	Stade Mustapha Tchaker, Blida	Gambia	4–1	2013 Africa Cup of Nations qualification

== Honours ==
Martigues

- Championnat National: 2023–24
- Championnat National 2: 2021–22
