= Aurélien Boche =

French footballer (born 1981)

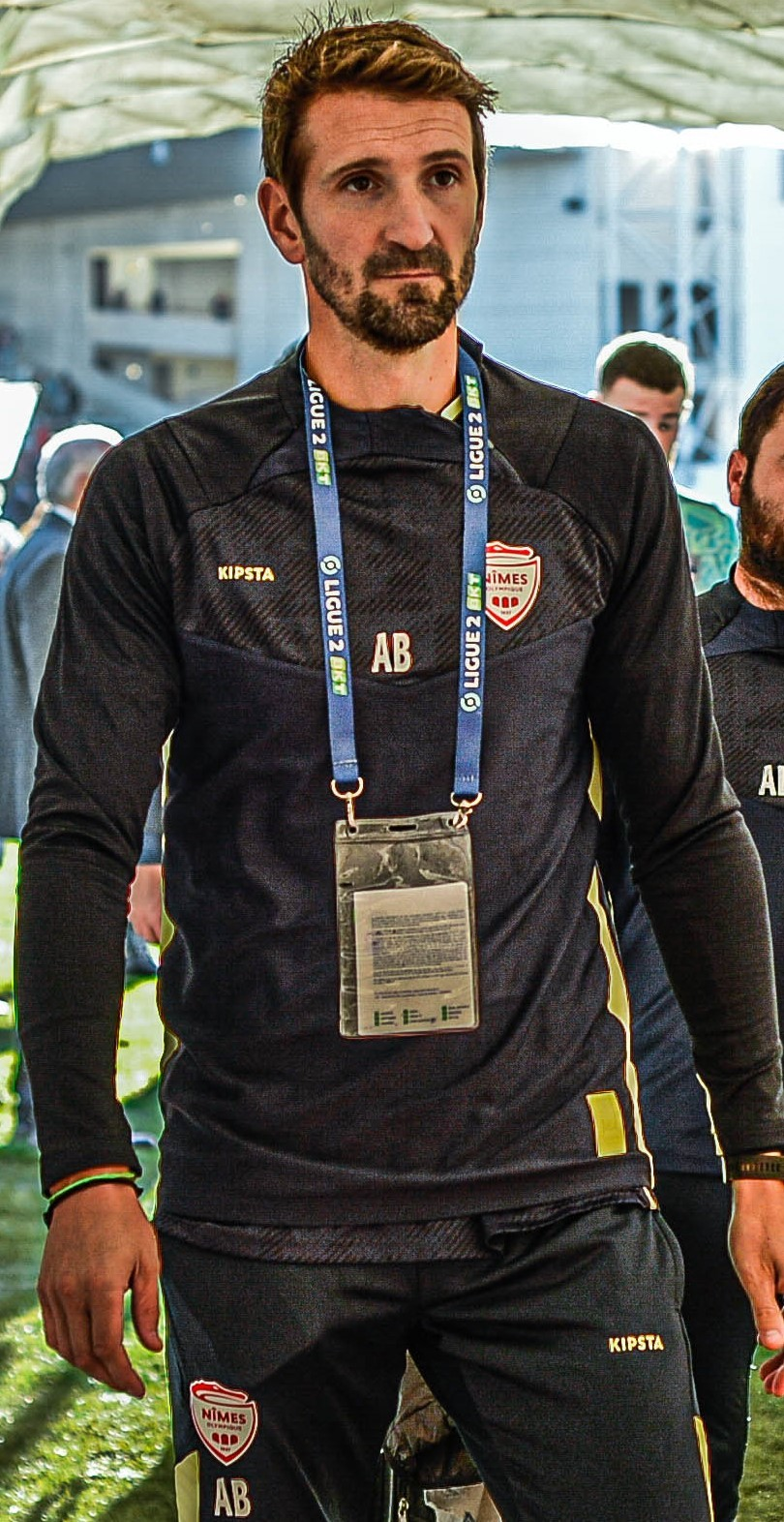
- Boche in 2022

Personal information
- Full name: Aurélien Boche
- Date of birth: 16 September 1981 (age 45)
- Place of birth: Niort, France
- Height: 1.85 m (6 ft 1 in)
- Position: Defender

Senior career*
| Years | Team | Apps | (Gls) |
| 2000–2003 | La Roche-sur-Yon | 42 | (0) |
| 2003–2004 | Angoulême | 22 | (1) |
| 2004–2005 | Roye | 36 | (3) |
| 2005–2006 | Cherbourg | 27 | (1) |
| 2006–2011 | Amiens | 90 | (0) |
| 2011–2014 | Nîmes | 61 | (4) |
| 2014–2015 | Istres | 15 | (1) |
| 2015 | Boulogne | 8 | (0) |
- * Club domestic league appearances and goals as of 01:23, 7 February 2018 (UTC)

Aurélien Boche (born 16 September 1981) is a retired French football defender who currently plays for Nîmes Olympique.
