= Bakaye Traoré =

Footballer (born 1985)

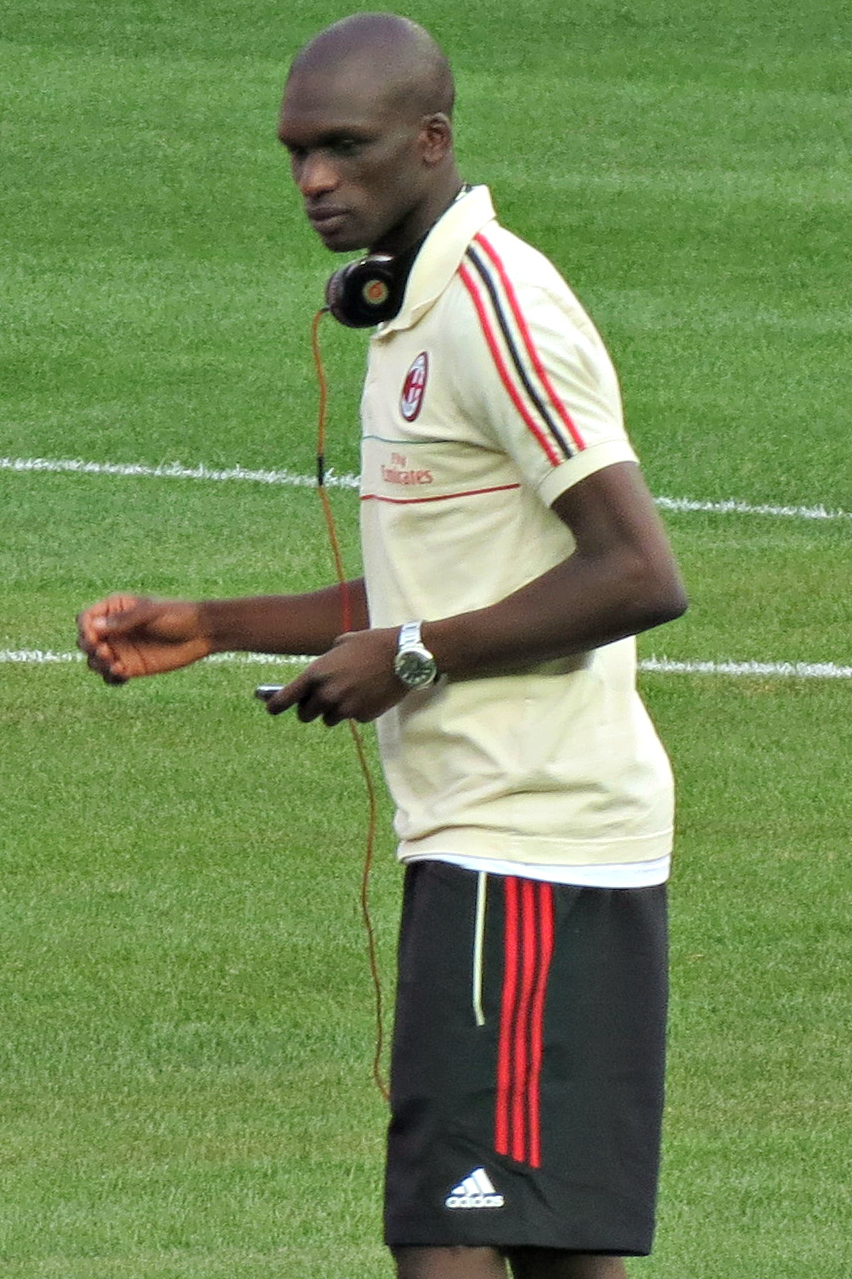
- Traoré in 2012

Personal information
- Date of birth: 6 March 1985 (age 41)
- Place of birth: Bondy, France
- Height: 1.86 m (6 ft 1 in)
- Position: Central midfielder

Youth career
- –2003: Villepinte FC

Senior career*
Years	Team	Apps	(Gls)
2003–2009	Amiens	106	(14)
2009–2012	Nancy	73	(11)
2012–2014	Milan	7	(0)
2013–2014	→ Kayseri Erciyesspor (loan)	25	(1)
2014–2016	Bursaspor	18	(1)
Total		229	(27)

International career
2009–2014	Mali	24	(2)
- * Club domestic league appearances and goals

Bakaye Traoré (born 6 March 1985) is a former professional footballer who played as a central midfielder for Amiens SC and AS Nancy in France, for A.C. Milan in Italy, and for Kayseri Erciyesspor and Bursaspor in Turkey. Born in France, he was capped 24 times at international level by Mali national team scoring twice.

== Club career ==
=== Amiens and Nancy ===
On 10 June 2009, Traoré left Amiens SC to sign a three-year deal with AS Nancy.

=== Milan ===
On 17 May 2012, Traoré signed a three-year contract with A.C. Milan. On 26 September 2012, he made his first appearance in Milan's 2–0 win against Cagliari in Serie A. He made seven first team appearances in his first season at Milan, all of them off the bench.

=== Kayseri Erciyesspor ===
On 5 September 2013, Traoré was sent on loan to Turkish Süper Lig club Kayseri Erciyesspor.

=== Bursaspor ===
After his contract has ended with Milan, he signed a contract for three years with Bursaspor.

== International career ==
Traoré was a member of the Mali national team and played his debut on 24 February 2009 against Angola.

== Career statistics ==
=== Club ===
Appearances and goals by club, season and competition
Club	Season	League			Cup (Note: Includes Coppa Italia, Coupe de France, Supercoppa Italiana, and Trophée des Champions matches)		League Cup (Note: Includes Coupe de la Ligue matches)		Europe		Total	
Club	Season	Division	Apps	Goals	Apps	Goals	Apps	Goals	Apps	Goals	Apps	Goals
Amiens	2004–05	Ligue 2	2	0	0	0	—		—		2	0
Amiens	2005–06	Ligue 2	22	0	2	0	—		—		24	0
Amiens	2006–07	Ligue 2	17	0	2	0	—		—		19	0
Amiens	2007–08	Ligue 2	31	6	7	3	—		—		38	9
Amiens	2008–09	Ligue 2	34	8	2	1	—		—		36	9
Amiens	Total		106	14	13	4	—		—		119	18
Nancy	2009–10	Ligue 1	22	1	1	0	1	0	—		24	1
Nancy	2010–11	Ligue 1	29	5	3	0	1	0	—		33	5
Nancy	2011–12	Ligue 1	22	5	1	0	0	0	—		23	5
Nancy	Total		73	11	5	0	2	0	—		80	11
Milan	2012–13	Serie A	7	0	1	0	—		1	0	9	0
Kayseri Erciyesspor (loan)	2013–14	Süper Lig	25	1	2	0	—		—		27	1
Bursaspor	2014–15	Süper Lig	10	0	6	2	—		2	0	18	2
Bursaspor	2015–16	Süper Lig	8	1	5	2	—		—		13	3
Bursaspor	Total		18	1	11	4	—		2	0	31	5
Career total			229	27	32	8	2	0	3	0	266	35

=== International ===
Appearances and goals by national team and year
National team	Year	Apps	Goals
Mali	2009	6	1
Mali	2010	5	0
Mali	2011	3	0
Mali	2012	6	1
Mali	2013	0	0
Mali	2014	4	0
Total		24	2

== Honours ==
Mali

- Africa Cup of Nations bronze: 2012
