= Ferenc Kónya =

Hungarian football coach (1892–1977)

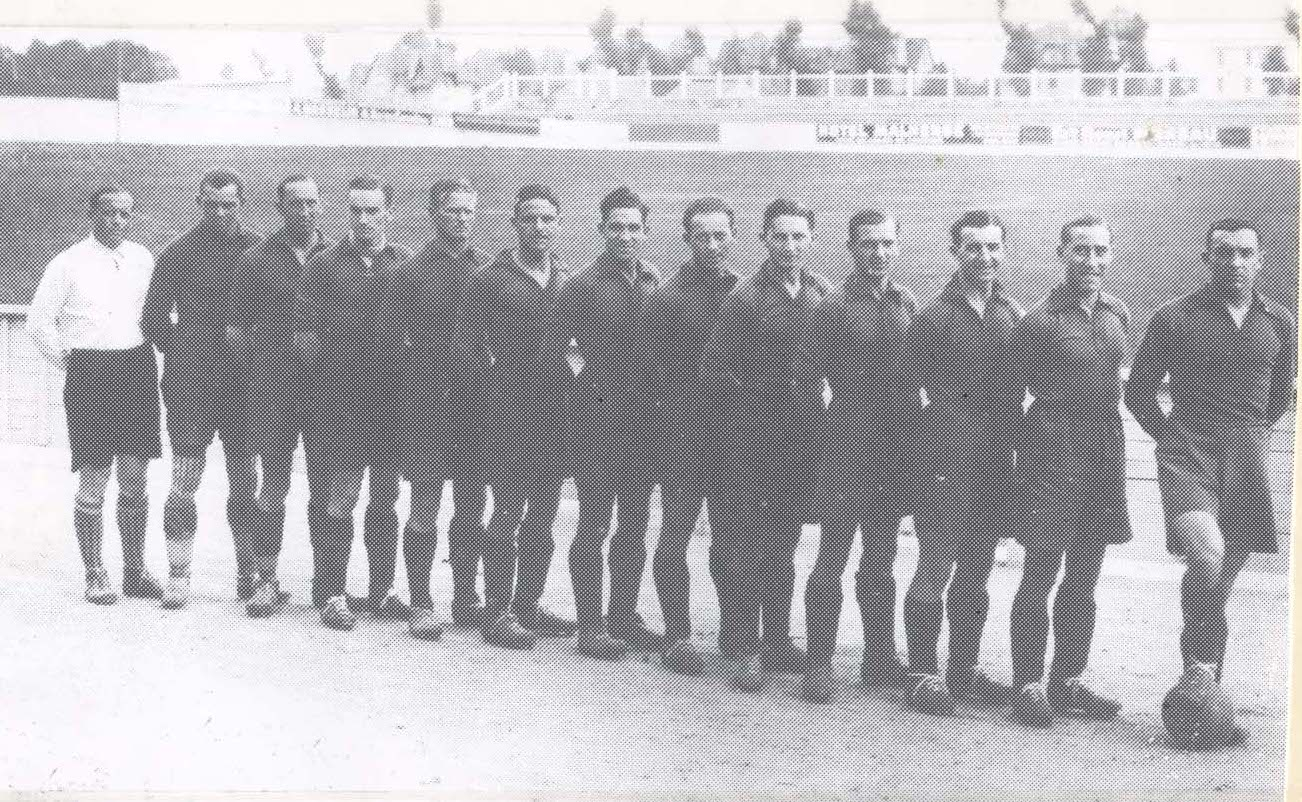
- Kónya, on the left with SM Caen in 1934

Personal information
- Date of birth: 9 December 1892
- Place of birth: Budapest, Austria-Hungary
- Date of death: 11 March 1977 (aged 84)
- Place of death: Budapest, Hungary
- Position: Forward

Senior career*
Years	Team	Apps	(Gls)
- Kispesti AC

Managerial career
- 1921–1922: 1. FC Kaiserslautern
- 1922–1924: Werder Bremen
- 1924: Estonia
- 1924–1925: Modena
- FC Olten
- 1927–1929: FC Luzern
- 1929–1931: BSC Old Boys
- 1934–1935: Caen
- * Club domestic league appearances and goals

Ferenc Kónya (9 December 1892 – 11 March 1977), also known as Franz Konya and François Konya, was a Hungarian football player and coach.

== Playing career ==
Kónya played for Kispesti AC.

== Coaching career ==
Kónya managed 1. FC Kaiserslautern, SV Werder Bremen, Estonia, Modena, FC Olten, FC Luzern and Caen.
