= Benoît Benvegnu =

French footballer (born 1985)

Personal information
- Full name: Benoît Benvegnu
- Date of birth: January 18, 1985 (age 41)
- Place of birth: Montauban, France
- Height: 1.84 m (6 ft 1/2 in)
- Position: Goalkeeper

Team information
- Current team: Vannes OC
- Number: 30

Senior career*
Years	Team	Apps	(Gls)
2004–2007	Toulouse	2	(0)
2007–2009	Amiens SC	40	(0)
2009–2010	Vannes OC	29	(0)
Medal record
Men's football
Representing France
UEFA European Under-17 Championship
Runner-up	2002 Denmark
- * Club domestic league appearances and goals as of 14:15, 13 November 2009 (UTC)

Benoît Benvegnu (born January 18, 1985) is a French football goalkeeper currently playing for Vannes OC in the French Ligue 2.

== Career ==
Born in Montauban, Benvegnu played youth football for Lafrançaise and Castelmaurou before joining Toulouse FC in 1999. He represented France at all youth levels, and helped the team to a runner's up finish at the 2002 UEFA European Under-17 Championship. Benvegnu joined Toulouse's senior side, but never was the club's first-choice goalkeeper. He made his only Ligue 1 appearances when Nicolas Douchez was suspended during a brief spell of January 2007.
