= Quentin de Parseval =

French footballer (born 1987)

Personal information
- Full name: Quentin de Parseval
- Date of birth: 21 September 1987 (age 39)
- Place of birth: Orléans, France
- Height: 1.85 m (6 ft 1 in)
- Position: Defender

Senior career*
Years	Team	Apps	(Gls)
2005–2006	Angers SCO	13	(0)
2006–2011	Amiens SC	60	(0)
- * Club domestic league appearances and goals as of 23:28, 20 December 2017 (UTC)

Quentin de Parseval (born 21 September 1987) is a French footballer who plays as a defender.

He signed for then-Ligue 2 side Amiens SC in the summer of 2006 from Angers SCO.
