= Titi Buengo =

Angolan footballer (born 1980)

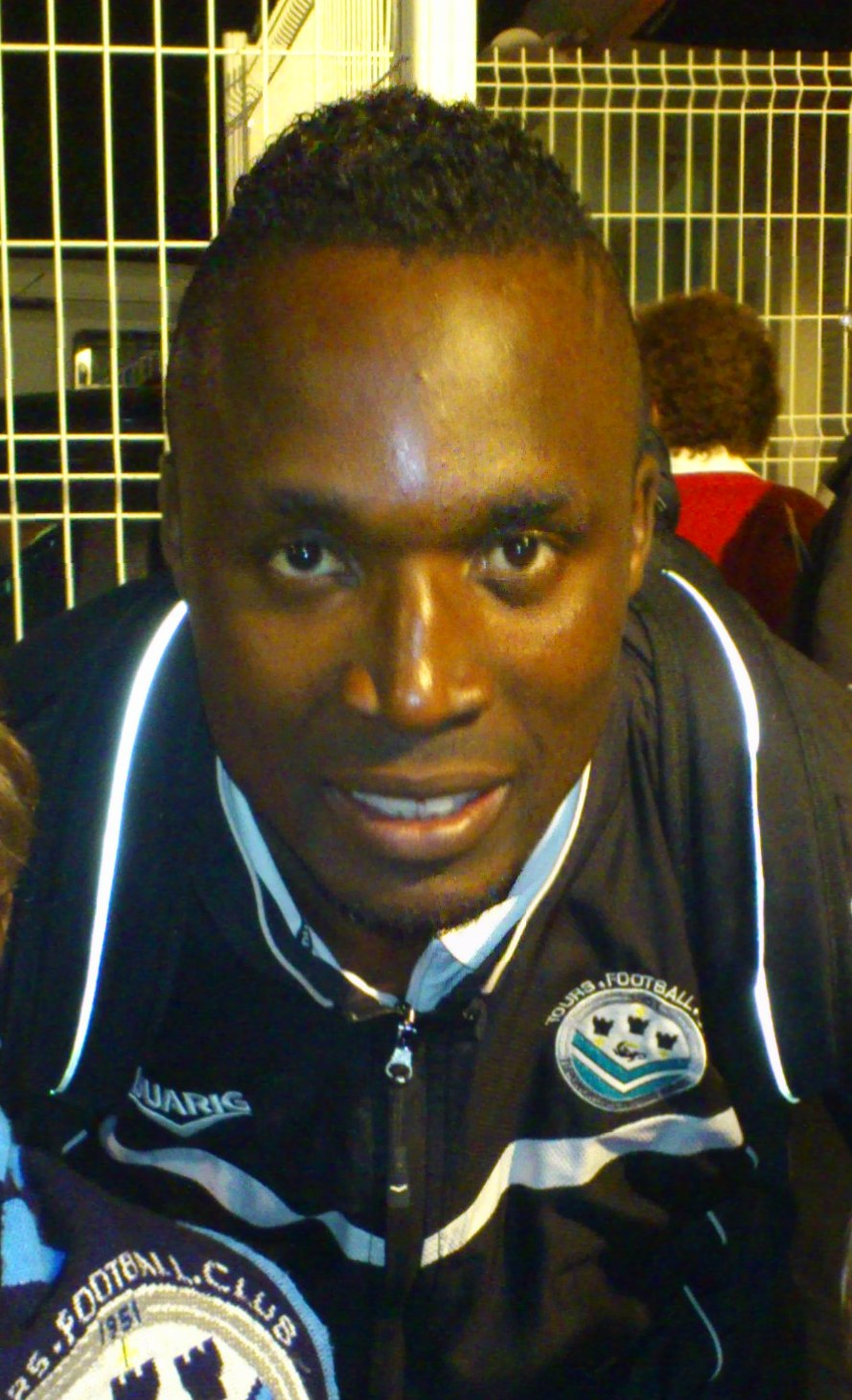

Personal information
- Full name: André Buengo
- Date of birth: 11 February 1980 (age 46)
- Place of birth: Luanda, Angola
- Height: 1.91 m (6 ft 3 in)
- Position: Striker

Senior career*
Years	Team	Apps	(Gls)
2000–2001	Olympique Saint-Quentin	31	(7)
2001–2002	Wasquehal	18	(3)
2002–2003	US Créteil	36	(8)
2003–2005	Grenoble	17	(2)
2005	Neuchâtel Xamax	12	(1)
2005–2006	Clermont Foot	26	(8)
2006–2008	Amiens	53	(17)
2008–2009	Troyes	27	(11)
2009–2010	Châteauroux	27	(14)
2010–2012	Tours	46	(12)
2013–2014	Olympiacos Volos	0	(0)
2014	Penang FA		(6)
2015–2016	Amiens	1	(0)

International career
2006–2012	Angola	7	(0)
- * Club domestic league appearances and goals

André "Titi" Buengo (born 11 February 1980) is an Angolan retired footballer who played as a striker.

== Early life ==
Born in Luanda, Buengo moved to France at the age of 8. He acquired French nationality by naturalization in July 2000.

Buengo is the son of former Petro de Luanda player Haia.

== Club career ==
Buengo played for Amiens, Neuchâtel Xamax, Créteil, and Troyes AC.

== International career ==
Buengo is a member of the Angola national team, and was called up to the 2006 World Cup.
