= Fabrice Levrat =

French footballer (born 1979)

Personal information
- Full name: Fabrice Levrat
- Date of birth: October 18, 1979 (age 47)
- Place of birth: Bourgoin-Jallieu, France
- Height: 1.73 m (5 ft 8 in)
- Position: Midfielder

Senior career*
Years	Team	Apps	(Gls)
1997–1999	Monaco Réserve	29	(2)
1999–2003	AC Ajaccio	72	(2)
2002–2003	→ Gueugnon (loan)	15	(1)
2003–2005	Gueugnon	56	(1)
2005–2009	Amiens	109	(1)
2009–2012	Laval	82	(2)
2013–2014	Boulogne	3	(0)
- * Club domestic league appearances and goals

Fabrice Levrat (born October 18, 1979), is a retired French football midfielder. He played for AS Monaco, AC Ajaccio, Amiens SC, FC Gueugnon, Laval, and US Boulogne. (Note: Fabrice Levrat – French league stats at LFP – also available in French (archived))
