= Joël Sami =

Footballer (born 1984)

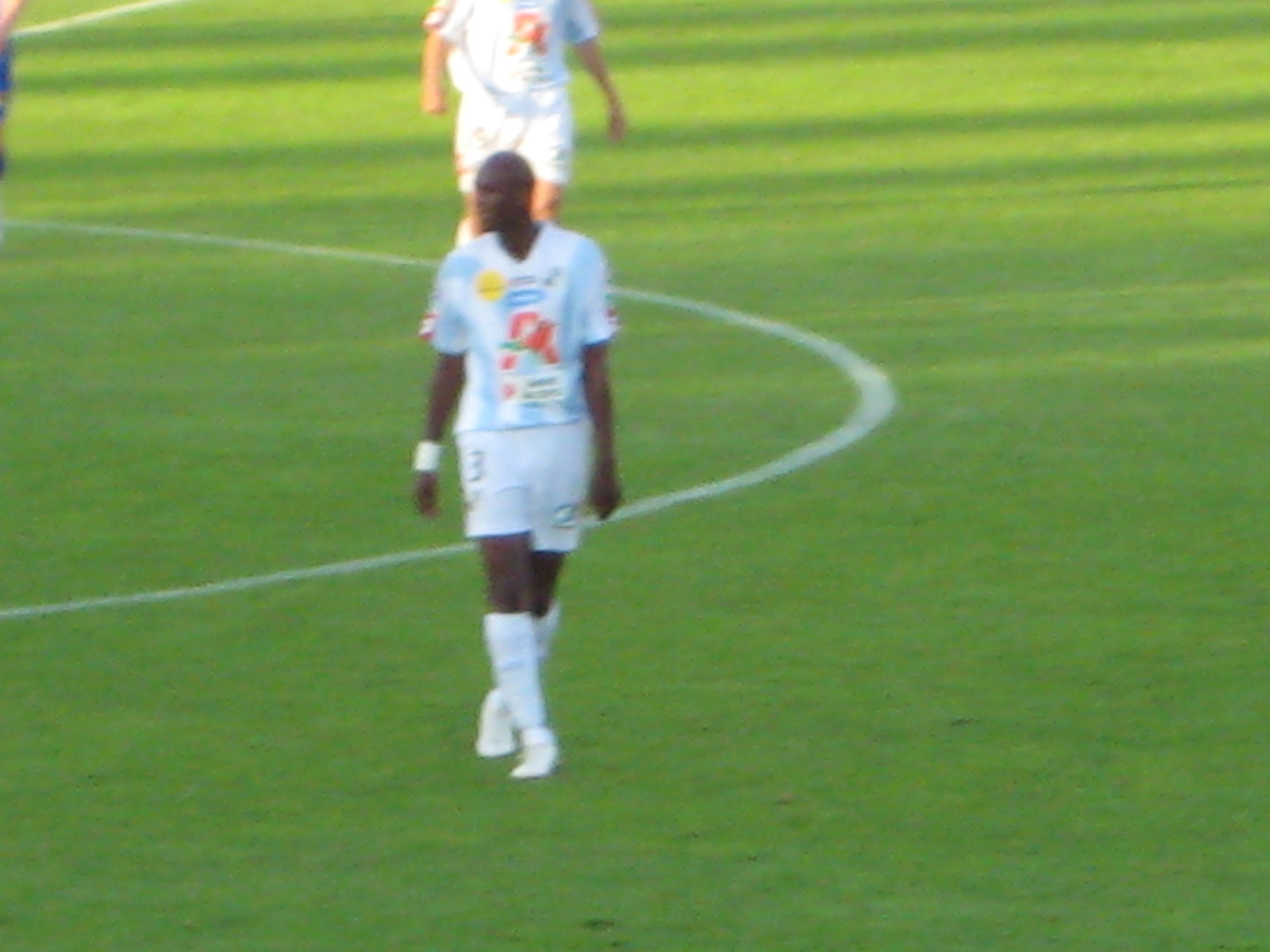
- Sami with Amiens

Personal information
- Full name: Andre-Joël Sami
- Date of birth: 13 November 1984 (age 41)
- Place of birth: Montfermeil, France
- Height: 1.91 m (6 ft 3 in)
- Position: Centre-back

Youth career
- 2002–2003: Valence B

Senior career*
Years	Team	Apps	(Gls)
2002–2004	Valence	3	(0)
2004–2008	Amiens	120	(10)
2008–2015	Nancy	181	(4)
2010–2013	Nancy B	10	(1)
2015–2016	Zulte Waregem	26	(0)
2016–2017	Orléans	31	(0)
2017–2018	Ratchaburi Mitr Phol	46	(3)
2019	Sukhothai	18	(2)
2020–2021	Nonthaburi United	18	(3)
2021–202?	USRF		

International career
2008–2012	DR Congo	5	(0)
- * Club domestic league appearances and goals

Andre-Joël Sami (born 13 November 1984) is a former professional footballer who played as a centre-back. Born in France, he made five appearances for the DR Congo national team.

== career ==
Sami was born in Montfermeil, Seine-Saint-Denis.

He was on trial at Leeds United during the 2003–04 pre-season and even appeared on the team photo. However, he did not sign for them and went on to have a trial with Bolton Wanderers on the recommendation of then Leeds United manager Peter Reid.

He made his first cap for the DR Congo national team against Algeria on 26 March 2008.
