= Louis Finot (footballer) =

French footballer (1909-1996)

Louis Finot (8 July 1909 in Saint-Maur-des-Fossés – 14 February 1996) was a French footballer who played as a winger. He played for France between 1930 and 1934, earning seven international caps. He was a French league champion with FC Sochaux.

== Career ==
During his football career, he played as a half-back. He was a French international between 1930 and 1934 while playing club football for Cercle athlétique de Paris. He earned seven caps for the France national team. In the national team, he played as a wing-half tasked with marking the opposing wingers or in a more offensive position on the right flank.
