= David Vairelles =

French footballer (born 1977)

Personal information
- Full name: David Vairelles
- Date of birth: 6 December 1977 (age 48)
- Place of birth: Essey-les-Nancy, France
- Height: 1.82 m (6 ft 0 in)
- Position: Defender

Senior career*
Years	Team	Apps	(Gls)
1997–1999	Nancy	1	(0)
1999–2002	Beauvais	105	(5)
2002–2005	Troyes	27	(0)
2005–2008	Amiens	77	(4)
2009–2011	Gueugnon	28	(1)
Total		238	(10)
- * Club domestic league appearances and goals

David Vairelles (born 6 December 1977) is a French former professional footballer who played as a defender.

Vairelles is the cousin of Tony Vairelles.

His twin brother Ludovic Vairelles played in the lower French leagues, mostly for SAS Épinal.
