= Sébastien Heitzmann =

French footballer (born 1979)

Personal information
- Date of birth: 11 September 1979 (age 47)
- Place of birth: Lyon, France
- Height: 1.78 m (5 ft 10 in)
- Position: Striker

Youth career
- AJ Auxerre

Senior career*
Years	Team	Apps	(Gls)
1995–2000	AJ Auxerre	0	(0)
2000–2001	Louhans-Cuiseaux	35	(18)
2001–2002	AS Beauvais Oise	4	(0)
2002–2002	Stade de Reims	23	(7)
2002–2003	Louhans-Cuiseaux	33	(7)
2003–2005	Dijon FCO	69	(30)
2005–2006	Stade de Reims	22	(9)
2006–2007	Valenciennes FC	15	(2)
2007–2009	Amiens SC	58	(10)
- * Club domestic league appearances and goals as of 31 July 2008

Sébastien Heitzmann (born 11 September 1979) is a French retired football striker who last played for Amiens SC.
