= Antoine Buron =

French footballer (born 1983)

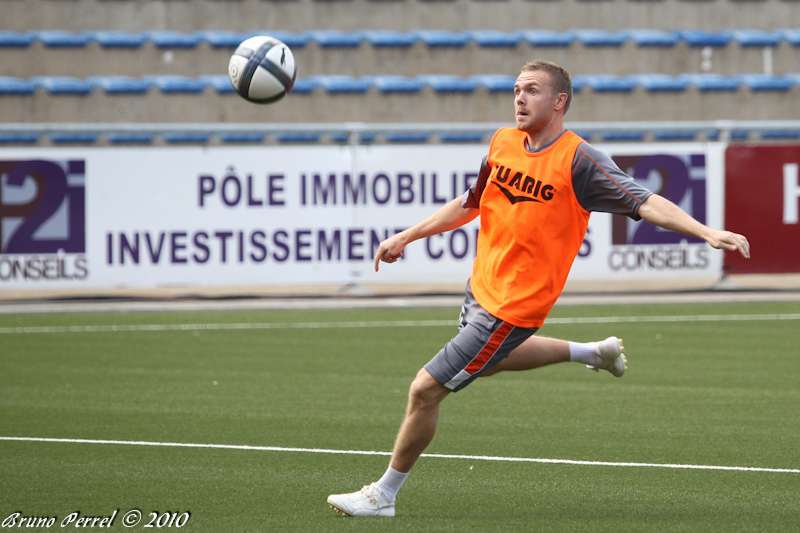

Personal information
- Date of birth: October 12, 1983 (age 43)
- Place of birth: Rouen, France
- Height: 1.72 m (5 ft 7 1/2 in)
- Position: Midfielder

Team information
- Current team: FC Dieppe

Senior career*
Years	Team	Apps	(Gls)
2000–2003	FC Dieppe		
2003–2008	Amiens	126	(15)
2008–2011	FC Lorient	1	(0)
2008–2009	→ Amiens (loan)	6	(0)
2011–	FC Dieppe		
- * Club domestic league appearances and goals as of 18:08, 19 October 2009 (UTC)

Antoine Buron (born October 12, 1983) is a French professional footballer currently playing for FC Dieppe. He previously played in Ligue 2 for Amiens and in Ligue 1 for Lorient.
