= Amiens SC =

Association football club in France

Amiens
- Full name: Amiens Sporting Club
- Nickname: Les Licornes (the Unicorns)
- Founded: 1901; 125 years ago
- Ground: Stade de la Licorne
- Capacity: 12,097
- President: Bernard Joannin
- Manager: Alain Pochat
- League: Ligue 3
- 2025–26: Ligue 2, 18th of 18 (relegated)
- Website: www.amiensfootball.com
Home colours	Away colours	Third colours

Amiens Sporting Club (French pronunciation: [amjɛ̃]; commonly referred to as Amiens SC or simply Amiens) is a French association football club based in the northern city of Amiens in the Hauts-de-France region. The club was formed in 1901 and play in Ligue 3, the third division of French football. The club plays its home matches at the Stade de la Licorne located within the city. The 2017–18 Ligue 1 season was the first in the club's 116-year history, where they finished in 13th place.

== History ==
Amiens Athlétic Club (AAC) was set up in 1901 by a group of players from the Association du Lycée d'Amiens, French schoolboy champions in 1902, 1903, and 1904. AAC crushed its first opponents, Saint-Quentin, 13–0 a few months after its creation. In April 1902, the Comité de Picardie de l'U.S.F.S.A was established by the then-president of the AAC (Henri-Frédéric Petit). AAC dominated the early USFSA league for the first 12 seasons. In 1909, the club got a new ground, at the Henry Daussy Park, allowing an attendance of more than 1,000.

In 1933, the club got its first professional section, later abandoned in 1952, before becoming professional again in 1993. Since the early days, AAC has undergone two name changes: In 1961, to Sporting Club d'Amiens, and in 1989, as Amiens Sporting Club. Amiens played in Ligue 2 between 2001 and 2009.

The team made a return to the second tier of French football for the 2016–17 season, after finishing 3rd in the Championnat National. Their first season back in Ligue 2 was the most successful ever, as they finished runners-up and were promoted to top-tier Ligue 1 for the first time ever. It was a dramatic promotion, too, as they would have dropped out of the promotion places but for a last-gasp winning goal in the final game against Reims. Amiens first season in Ligue 1 ended in survival with a comfortable 13th-placed finish in the table.

In the 2018–19 season, Amiens finished in 15th place on the table and secured their survival after a 2–1 victory over already relegated EA Guingamp.

Despite this, during the 2019–20 season with just 10 games to play, the side sat in 19th position having slipped down the table after a modest start, sitting just 4 points behind 18th placed Nîmes. The LFP suspended Ligue 1 and Ligue 2 indefinitely as a result of the coronavirus outbreak, and on 30 April 2020, the league title was awarded to Paris Saint-Germain and thus the bottom two placed teams, Amiens and Toulouse, were automatically relegated to Ligue 2 for the 2020–21 season.

== Players ==
=== Current squad ===
As of 5 September 2026

Note: Flags indicate national team as defined under FIFA eligibility rules; some limited exceptions apply. Players may hold more than one non-FIFA nationality.

No.	Pos.	Nation	Player
1	GK	FRA	Victor Delins
3	DF	FRA	Adrien Julloux
4	DF	FRA	Keny Mbala
5	MF	FRA	Thomas Monconduit
6	MF	FRA	Gatien Foll
8	MF	BIH	Ćazim Suljić
9	FW	FRA	Marvin Adélaïde
10	MF	GEO	Zourab Sopromadze
11	MF	FRA	Côme Fromager
12	DF	FRA	Anthony Ribelin
14	DF	FRA	Enzo Couto
15	FW	FRA	Mathis Colin
16	GK	FRA	Calvin Obin
17	MF	FRA	Alexis Giacomini
18	MF	COD	Messy Manitu

No.	Pos.	Nation	Player
19	DF	FRA	Antoine Nuss
20	DF	FRA	Lucas Llort
21	FW	FRA	Alvin Doucet
22	DF	FRA	Rémy Boissier
23	MF	FRA	Nolan Hérissé
24	MF	FRA	Enzo Somon
25	DF	FRA	Enzo Genton (on loan from Lorient)
26	FW	CMR	Christ Letono
27	DF	MLI	Dan Sinaté (on loan from Angers)
28	FW	FRA	Ely Julien
29	DF	FRA	Mamadou Camara
39	DF	MAR	Amine Chabane
40	GK	COM	Yannick Pandor
59	DF	FRA	Nathan Talbot
—	FW	FRA	Yanis Rafii

=== Out on loan ===
Note: Flags indicate national team as defined under FIFA eligibility rules; some limited exceptions apply. Players may hold more than one non-FIFA nationality.

No.	Pos.	Nation	Player
—	FW	FRA	Peterson Paul (at Furiani-Agliani until 30 June 2027)

=== Current technical staff ===
Position	Name
Manager	(Senegal) Omar Daf
Assistant Managers	(France) Mickaël Debève (France) Julien Ielsch
Goalkeeping coach	(France) Brice Morin
Fitness coach	(France) Antoine Helterlin
Youth coach	(Senegal) Modou Sougou
Club doctor	(France) Christophe Carpentier (France) Pierre-Alexis Bouvier

=== Notable former players ===
Below are the notable former players who have represented Amiens and its predecessors in league and international competition since the club's foundation in 1901. To appear in the section below, a player must have played in at least 80 official matches for the club.

For a list of former Amiens players, see Category:Amiens SC players.

- (France) Fabrice Abriel
- (France) Stéphane Adam
- (France) Joël Beaujouan
- (France) Thierry Bonalair
- (France) Antoine Buron
- (France) David De Freitas
- (France) Jean-Louis Delecroix
- (France) Emmanuel Duchemin
- (France) Thibault Giresse
- (France) Stéphane Hernandez
- (France) Sébastien Heitzmann
- (France) Julien Lachuer
- (France) Arnaud Lebrun
- (France) Eric Luc Leclerc
- (France) Jean Mankowski
- (France) Pierre Mankowski
- (France) Cyrille Merville
- (France) Olivier Pickeu
- (France) David Vairelles
- (Algeria) Lakhdar Adjali
- (Angola) Titi Buengo
- (Argentina) Fernando Casartelli
- (Democratic Republic of the Congo) Joël Sami
- (Republic of the Congo) Oscar Ewolo
- (Togo) Jean-Paul Abalo
- (Tunisia) Fahid Ben Khalfallah

== Managers ==
- (Hungary) Ferenc Kónya (1933–34)
- (France) Jules Limbeck (1934–35)
- (France) Raymond Demey (1935–36)
- (France) Louis Finot (1942–43)
- (Denmark) Kaj Andrup (1945–46)
- (France) Pierre Illiet (1946–47)
- (France) Mony Braunstein (1947–48)
- (France) André Riou (1950–51)
- (France) Édouard Harduin (1958–59)
- (France) Jean Mankowski (1959–60)
- (France) Emilien Méresse (1960–68)
- (France) André Grillon (1968–77)
- (France) Robert Buchot (1977–79)
- (France) Paul Pruvost (1979 – December 79)
- (France) Robert Buchot (December 1979–80)
- (France) Claude Le Roy and Paul Pruvost (1980–81)
- (France) Claude Le Roy (1981–83)
- (France) Gabriel Desmenez (1983–85)
- (France) Camille Choquier (1985–87)
- (France) Joël Beaujouan (1987 – April 1988)
- (France) Hughes Jullien (April 1988–92)
- (France) Patrick Parizon (1992–94)
- (France) Arnaud Dos Santos (1994 – November 1998)
- (France) René Marsiglia (November 1998 – February 2000)
- (France) Victor Zvunka (February 2000–00)
- (France) Denis Troch (2000–04)
- (France) Alex Dupont (2004 – March 2006)
- (France) Ludovic Batelli (March 2006–08)
- (France) Thierry Laurey (March 2008 – June 2009)
- (France) Serge Romano (June 2009 – October 2009)
- (France) Ludovic Batelli (October 2009 – June 2012)
- (France) Francis De Taddeo (July 2012 – September 2013)
- (France) Olivier Echouafni (September 2013 – 2014)
- (France) Samuel Michel (June 2014– December 2014)
- (France) Christophe Pélissier (December 2014– June 2019)
- (Slovenia) Luka Elsner (July 2019–September 2020)
- (France) Philippe Hinschberger (June 2021-April 2023)
- (France) Patrice Descamps (interim, April 2023-June 2023)
- (Senegal) Omar Daf (June 2023-present)

== Honours ==
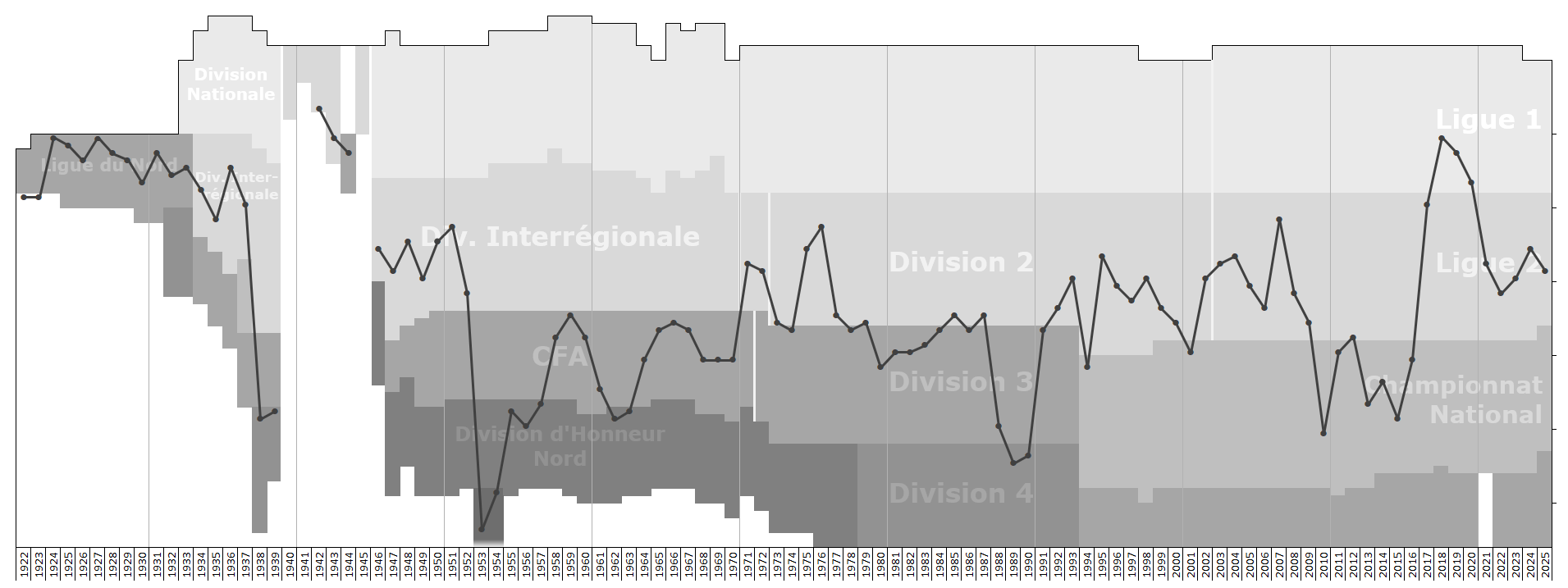
Historical league performance chart of Amiens SC

- Championnat de France/Ligue 1
  - Runners-up (1): 1926–27
- Coupe de France
  - Runners-up (1): 2000–01
- Championnat National
  - Champions (1): 1977–78
- Division d'Honneur (Nord)
  - Champions (4): 1924, 1927, 1957, 1963
- Division d'Honneur (Picardie)
  - Champions (2): 1920, 1921
- USFSA League (Picardie)
  - Champions (11): 1903, 1904, 1905, 1906, 1908, 1909, 1910, 1911, 1912, 1913, 1914

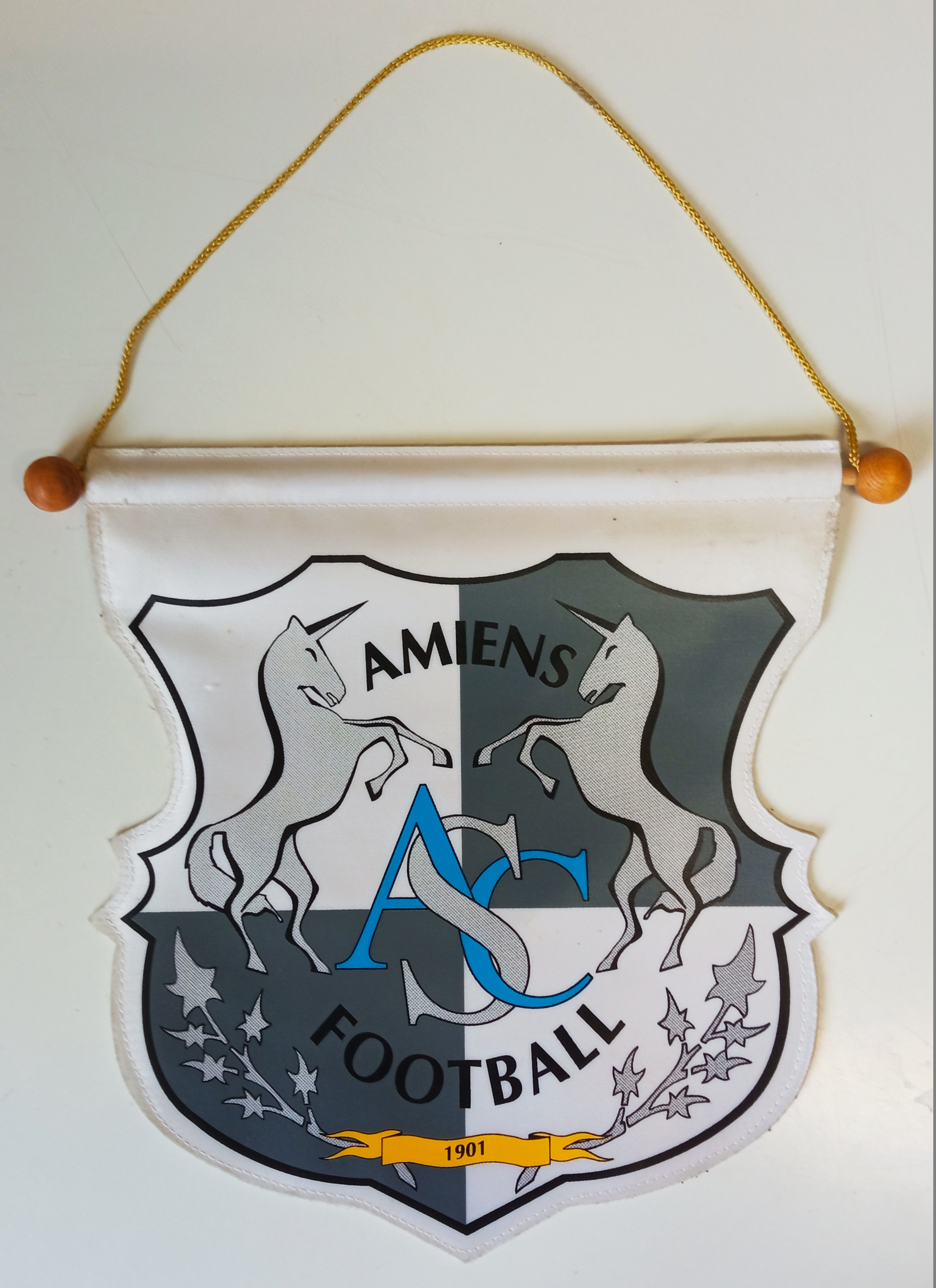
