= 2004–05 Grenoble Foot 38 season =

Grenoble Foot 38
2022–23 season
- Chairman: Kazutoshi Watanabe
- Manager: Thierry Goudet
- Stadium: Stade Lesdiguières
- Ligue 2: 10th
- Coupe de France: Quarter-finals
- Coupe de la Ligue: First round
- Top goalscorer: League: Gaël Danic; Robert Malm (9 each); All: Gaël Danic (12)
- Average home league attendance: 5,063; Ligue 2
- Biggest win: 5–1 against Niort
- Biggest defeat: 5–0 against Clermont

The 2004–05 Grenoble Foot 38 season was the club's 106th season in its existence and the fifth consecutive season in the Ligue 2. In addition to the domestic season, Grenoble Foot 38 participated in the Coupe de France and the Coupe de la Ligue.

== Players ==
=== First-team squad ===
Note: Flags indicate national team as defined under FIFA eligibility rules; some limited exceptions apply. Players may hold more than one non-FIFA nationality.

No.	Pos.	Nation	Player
—	GK	FRA	Fabien Debec
—	GK	CMR	Gilbert Bayiha N'Djema
—	DF	FRA	Frédéric Jay
—	DF	CMR	Bertin Tokéné
—	DF	FRA	Jérémy Stinat
—	DF	FRA	Jean-Marc Chanelet
—	DF	BFA	Ousmane Traoré
—	DF	FRA	Kevin Hatchi
—	MF	FRA	Gaël Danic
—	MF	FRA	Julien Delétraz
—	MF	FRA	Matthieu Gianni
—	MF	FRA	Nasser Menassel

No.	Pos.	Nation	Player
—	MF	FRA	Wilfried Dalmat
—	MF	MAR	Chakhir Belghazouani
—	MF	FRA	David de Freitas
—	MF	FRA	Julien François
—	MF	FRA	Biagui Kamissoko
—	MF	NGA	Egutu Oliseh
—	FW	ALG	Nassim Akrour
—	FW	ANG	Titi Buengo
—	FW	ARG	Sergio Rojas
—	FW	FRA	Ghislain Gimbert
—	FW	TOG	Robert Malm
—	FW	FRA	Hakim Saci

== Pre-season and friendlies ==
Win Draw Loss

7 July 2004 Friendly	Marseille (France)	2–1	(France) Grenoble	Albertville
19:30 CEST (UTC+2)	Hemdani 5' (pen.); Camus 72'		Menassel 60'	Stadium: Stade du Sauvay; Attendance: 6,000

16 July 2004 Friendly	Grenoble (France)	1–1	(France) Paris Saint-Germain	Aix-les-Bains
--:-- CEST (UTC+2)	Malm 73'		Bošković 13'	Stadium: Stade Jacques-Forestier; Attendance: 2,800

== Competitions ==
=== Overall record ===
Competition	First match	Last match	Starting round	Final position	Record							
Competition	First match	Last match	Starting round	Final position	Pld	W	D	L	GF	GA	GD	Win %
Ligue 2	6 August 2004	27 May 2005	Matchday 1	10th	38	12	12	14	45	50	−5	31.58
Coupe de France	20 November 2004	19 April 2005	Seventh round	Quarter-finals	6	5	0	1	11	6	+5	83.33
Coupe de la Ligue	6 October 2004		First round	First round	1	0	1	0	0	0	+0	0.00
Total					45	17	13	15	56	56	+0	37.78

Source: Competitions

=== Ligue 2 ===
==== League table ====
Pos	Team	Pld	W	D	L	GF	GA	GD	Pts
9	Brest	38	13	16	9	38	34	+4	55
10	Lorient	38	14	8	16	47	51	−4	50
11	Grenoble	38	12	12	14	45	50	−5	48
12	Gueugnon	38	12	12	14	30	40	−10	48
13	Amiens	38	11	14	13	41	41	0	47

Source: Ligue 2

==== Results summary ====
Overall								Home						Away					
Pld	W	D	L	GF	GA	GD	Pts	W	D	L	GF	GA	GD	W	D	L	GF	GA	GD
38	12	12	14	45	50	−5	48	9	6	4	28	19	+9	3	6	10	17	31	−14

Source: Ligue 2

==== Results by round ====
Round	1	2	3	4	5	6	7	8	9	10	11	12	13	14	15	16	17	18	19	20	21	22	23	24	25	26	27	28	29	30	31	32	33	34	35	36	37	38
Ground	H	A	H	A	H	A	H	A	H	H	A	H	A	H	A	H	A	H	A	H	A	H	A	H	A	H	A	A	H	A	H	A	H	A	H	A	H	A
Result	W	W	D	L	D	D	W	L	W	W	D	D	D	D	L	L	D	L	L	W	W	W	D	W	L	W	L	L	L	W	W	L	L	D	D	L	D	L
Position	1	1	3	7	9	10	6	8	6	2	5	5	5	5	9	10	10	14	16	11	9	7	7	6	7	5	8	10	11	10	8	10	11	10	10	10	10	10

Source: Ligue 2
A = Away; H = Home; W = Win; D = Draw; L = Loss

==== Matches ====
6 August 2004 1	Grenoble	4–2	Guingamp	Grenoble
20:00 CEST (UTC+2)	Malm 32', 54' (pen.); Yahia 52' (o.g.); Rojas 90'	Report	Dagano 63', 87'	Stadium: Stade Lesdiguières; Referee: Patrick Lhermite

13 August 2004 2	Niort	1–3	Grenoble	Niort
20:00 CEST (UTC+2)	Michel 19'	Report	Buengo 17'; Danic 43'; Malm 64'	Stadium: Stade René Gaillard; Referee: Eric Brocas

17 August 2004 3	Grenoble	1–1	Amiens	Grenoble
20:00 CEST (UTC+2)	Malm 51'	Report	Casartelli 63' (pen.)	Stadium: Stade Lesdiguières; Referee: Améziane Khendek

20 August 2004 4	Clermont	5–0	Grenoble	Clermont-Ferrand
20:00 CEST (UTC+2)	Brando 8'; Tabet 64'; Poyet 77'; Faye 80'; Chanelet 86' (o.g.)	Report		Stadium: Stade Gabriel Montpied; Referee: Jean-Charles Cailleux

27 August 2004 5	Grenoble	1–1	Créteil	Grenoble
20:00 CEST (UTC+2)	Malm 56'	Report	Pataca 57'	Stadium: Stade Lesdiguières; Referee: Jean-Marc Rodolphe

3 September 2004 6	Reims	1–1	Grenoble	Reims
20:00 CEST (UTC+2)	Dossevi 47'	Report	Malm 46'	Stadium: Stade Auguste-Delaune; Referee: Jean-Marc Bonnin

10 September 2004 7	Grenoble	2–1	Le Mans	Grenoble
20:00 CEST (UTC+2)	Danic 3'; Malm 61' (pen.)	Report	Fanchone 42'	Stadium: Stade Lesdiguières; Referee: Laurent Duhamel

17 September 2004 8	Gueugnon	1–0	Grenoble	Gueugnon
20:00 CEST (UTC+2)	Hissein 67' (pen.)	Report		Stadium: Stade Jean Laville; Attendance: 3,676; Referee: Olivier Lamarre

21 September 2004 9	Grenoble	2–1	Le Havre	Grenoble
19:00 CEST (UTC+2)	Menassel 71'; Buengo 83'	Report	Danic 46'	Stadium: Stade Lesdiguières; Referee: Saïd Ennjimi

24 September 2004 10	Grenoble	2–1	Laval	Grenoble
20:00 CEST (UTC+2)	De Freitas 27'; Danic 35'	Report	Marco Paulo 88'	Stadium: Stade Lesdiguières; Referee: Philippe Kalt

1 October 2004 11	Brest	1–1	Grenoble	Brest
20:00 CEST (UTC+2)	Fortuné 36'	Report	Danic 13'	Stadium: Stade Francis-Le Blé; Referee: Jean-Marc Rodolphe

18 October 2004 12	Grenoble	0–0	Sedan	Grenoble
20:15 CEST (UTC+2)		Report		Stadium: Stade Lesdiguières; Referee: Stéphane Djouzi

22 October 2004 13	Châteauroux	1–1	Grenoble	Châteauroux
20:00 CEST (UTC+2)	Boukari 61'	Report	Danic 36'	Stadium: Stade Gaston Petit; Referee: Sandryk Biton

29 October 2004 14	Grenoble	0–0	Montpellier	Grenoble
20:00 CEST (UTC+2)		Report		Stadium: Stade Lesdiguières; Referee: Yves Brizou

5 November 2004 15	Dijon	2–1	Grenoble	Dijon
20:00 CET (UTC+1)	Asuar 45'; Larcier 60'	Report	Malm 16'	Stadium: Stade Gaston Gérard; Referee: Hervé Piccirillo

12 November 2004 16	Grenoble	1–2	Troyes	Grenoble
20:00 CET (UTC+1)	Malm 32'	Report	Dallet 36'; Garny 88'	Stadium: Stade Lesdiguières; Referee: Lionel Jaffredo

26 November 2004 17	Angers	0–0	Grenoble	Angers
20:00 CET (UTC+1)		Report		Stadium: Stade Raymond Kopa; Attendance: 4,083; Referee: Olivier Lamarre

3 December 2004 18	Grenoble	1–2	Lorient	Grenoble
20:00 CET (UTC+1)	François 51'	Report	Koné 16'; Bastien 80'	Stadium: Stade Lesdiguières; Referee: Eric Brocas

17 December 2004 19	Nancy	2–0	Grenoble	Tomblaine
20:00 CET (UTC+1)	Dufresne 19'; Zerka 79'	Report		Stadium: Stade Marcel Picot; Referee: Pascal Vileo

11 January 2005 20	Grenoble	5–1	Niort	Grenoble
20:00 CET (UTC+1)	Rojas 23'; Oliseh 47'; Tokéné 52'; Akrour 65'; Danic 84' (pen.)	Report	Deschamps 29' (pen.)	Stadium: Stade Lesdiguières; Referee: Jérome Auroux

17 January 2005 21	Amiens	0–2	Grenoble	Amiens
20:15 CET (UTC+1)		Report	Danic 48'; Akrour 64'	Stadium: Stade de la Licorne; Referee: Pascal Vileo

25 January 2005 23	Créteil	0–0	Grenoble	Créteil
20:00 CET (UTC+1)		Report		Stadium: Stade Dominique Duvauchelle; Referee: Améziane Khendek

4 February 2005 25	Le Mans	1–0	Grenoble	Le Mans
20:00 CET (UTC+1)	Ba 29'	Report		Stadium: Stade Léon-Bollée; Referee: Serge Fidri

8 February 2005 22	Grenoble	1–0	Clermont	Grenoble
20:00 CET (UTC+1)	Akrour 69'	Report		Stadium: Stade Lesdiguières; Referee: Sandryk Biton
Note: Postponed from 22 January 2005.

18 February 2005 26	Grenoble	2–1	Gueugnon	Grenoble
20:00 CET (UTC+1)	Traoré 6'; Danic 69'	Report	N'Zigou 5'	Stadium: Stade Lesdiguières; Referee: Gaël Lecellier

22 February 2005 24	Grenoble	2–0	Reims	Grenoble
20:00 CET (UTC+1)	David de Freitas 30'; Akrour 53'	Report		Stadium: Stade Lesdiguières; Referee: Eric Brocas
Note: Postponed from 28 January 2005.

25 February 2005 27	Le Havre	2–1	Grenoble	Le Mans
20:00 CET (UTC+1)	Roda 51'; Lesage 81'	Report	Akrour 5'	Stadium: Stade Jules Deschaseaux; Referee: Gilles Veissière

5 March 2005 28	Laval	3–1	Grenoble	Laval
20:00 CET (UTC+1)	Marco Paulo 11', 82'; Zoko 86'	Report	Danic 52'	Stadium: Stade Francis Le Basser; Referee: Jean-Charles Cailleux

11 March 2005 29	Grenoble	0–2	Brest	Grenoble
20:00 CET (UTC+1)		Report	Massot 17'; Malm 60'	Stadium: Stade Lesdiguières; Referee: Pascal Garibian

18 March 2005 30	Sedan	1–2	Grenoble	Sedan
21:00 CET (UTC+1)	Mokaké 90'	Report	De Freitas 49'; François 80'	Stadium: Stade Louis Dugauguez; Referee: Yves Brizou

1 April 2005 31	Grenoble	2–0	Châteauroux	Grenoble
20:00 CEST (UTC+2)	Oliseh 23' (pen.); Gimbert 90'	Report		Stadium: Stade Lesdiguières; Attendance: 7,093; Referee: Olivier Lamarre

8 April 2005 32	Montpellier	3–1	Grenoble	Montpellier
20:00 CEST (UTC+2)	Cissé 21', 50'; Bugnet 38'	Report	Kamissoko 27'	Stadium: Stade de la Mosson; Attendance: 5,503; Referee: Lionel Jaffredo

15 April 2005 33	Grenoble	1–3	Dijon	Grenoble
20:00 CEST (UTC+2)	Kamissoko 86'	Report	Heitzmann 2'; Tacalfred 7'; Ibišević 35'	Stadium: Stade Lesdiguières; Referee: Jean-Marc Rodolphe

22 April 2005 34	Troyes	2–2	Grenoble	Troyes
20:00 CEST (UTC+2)	Gomis 28'; Liron 78'	Report	Dalmat 12'; Gimbert 50'	Stadium: Stade de l'Aube; Attendance: 8,142; Referee: Eric Brocas

6 May 2005 35	Grenoble	0–0	Angers	Grenoble
20:00 CEST (UTC+2)		Report		Stadium: Stade Lesdiguières; Attendance: 4,061; Referee: Serge Fidri

13 May 2005 36	Lorient	2–0	Grenoble	Lorient
20:00 CEST (UTC+2)	Morel 24'; Koné 63' (pen.)	Report		Stadium: Stade du Moustoir; Attendance: 5,776; Referee: Stéphane Moulin

20 May 2005 37	Grenoble	1–1	Nancy	Grenoble
20:30 CEST (UTC+2)	Akrour 47'	Report	Fauré 84'	Stadium: Stade Lesdiguières; Attendance: 5,784; Referee: Gilles Veissière

27 May 2005 38	Guingamp	3–1	Grenoble	Guingamp
20:45 CEST (UTC+2)	Fauré 2', 12'; Abriel 36'	Report	Gimbert 61'	Stadium: Stade de Roudourou; Attendance: 15,597; Referee: Bruno Derrien

=== Coupe de France ===
20 November 2004 Seventh round	Grenoble	1–0	Lunel	Grenoble
CET (UTC+1)	Buengo 85'			Stadium: Stade des Alpes

11 December 2004 Eighth round	Grenoble	1–0	Lyon La Duchère	Grenoble
CET (UTC+1)	Kamissoko 88'			Stadium: Stade Lesdiguières

7 January 2005 Round of 64	Châteauroux	2–3 (a.e.t.)	Grenoble	Châteauroux
20:00 CET (UTC+1)	Mulenga 33'; Boukari 48'		Gimbert 62'; Rojas 65'; Danic 110'	Stadium: Stade Gaston Petit; Attendance: 4,273; Referee: Stéphane Djiouzi

12 February 2005 Round of 32	FC Rhône Vallées	1–2	Grenoble	Valence
18:00 CET (UTC+1)	Fabra 22' (pen.)		François 34'; Akrour 39'	Stadium: Stade Georges Pompidou; Attendance: 5,725; Referee: Olivier Thual

2 March 2005 Round of 16	Lille	1–3 (a.e.t.)	Grenoble	Villeneuve-d'Ascq
19:00 CET (UTC+1)	Fauvergue 32'		Danic 47', 105'; Akrour 120'	Stadium: Stadium Lille Métropole; Attendance: 3,465; Referee: Stéphane Moulin

19 April 2005 Quarter-finals	Sedan	2–1 (a.e.t.)	Grenoble	Sedan
18:15 CEST (UTC+2)	Noro 24'; Citony 118'		Rojas 75'	Stadium: Stade Émile Albeau; Attendance: 8,769; Referee: Bruno Coué

=== Coupe de la Ligue ===
6 October 2004 First round	Le Mans	0–0 (a.e.t.) (4–3 p)	Grenoble	Le Mans
20:00 CEST (UTC+2)			Kamissoko (red card) 110'	Stadium: Stade Léon-Bollée; Attendance: 5,517; Referee: Améziane Khendek
	Penalties
	Fanchone (penalty missed); Bonnart (penalty scored); Thomas (penalty scored); Lucau (penalty scored); Hautcœur (penalty scored)		(penalty scored) Danic; (penalty missed) Stinat; (penalty scored) de Freitas; (penalty scored) Hatchi; (penalty missed) Chanelet

== Statistics ==
=== Goalscorers ===
Rank	Pos	No.	Nat	Name	Ligue 2	Coupe de France	Coupe de la Ligue	Total
1	FW	8	(France)	Gaël Danic	9	3	0	12
2	FW		(Togo)	Robert Malm	9	0	0	9
3	FW		(Algeria)	Nassim Akrour	6	2	0	8
4	FW		(France)	Ghislain Gimbert	3	1	0	4
4	FW	9	(Argentina)	Sergio Rojas	2	2	0	4
4	MF	18	(France)	David de Freitas	3	0	0	3
4	FW		(Angola)	Titi Buengo	2	1	0	3
4	MF	19	(France)	Julien François	2	1	0	3
4	MF	26	(France)	Biagui Kamissoko	2	1	0	3
5	MF	12	(Nigeria)	Egutu Oliseh	2	0	0	2
7	MF	7	(France)	Wilfried Dalmat	1	0	0	1
7	MF	21	(France)	Nasser Menassel	1	0	0	1
7	DF	5	(Cameroon)	Bertin Tokéné	1	0	0	1
7	DF	15	(Burkina Faso)	Ousmane Traoré	1	0	0	1
Own goals					1	0	0	1
Totals					45	11	0	56
