= List of Dijon FCO seasons =

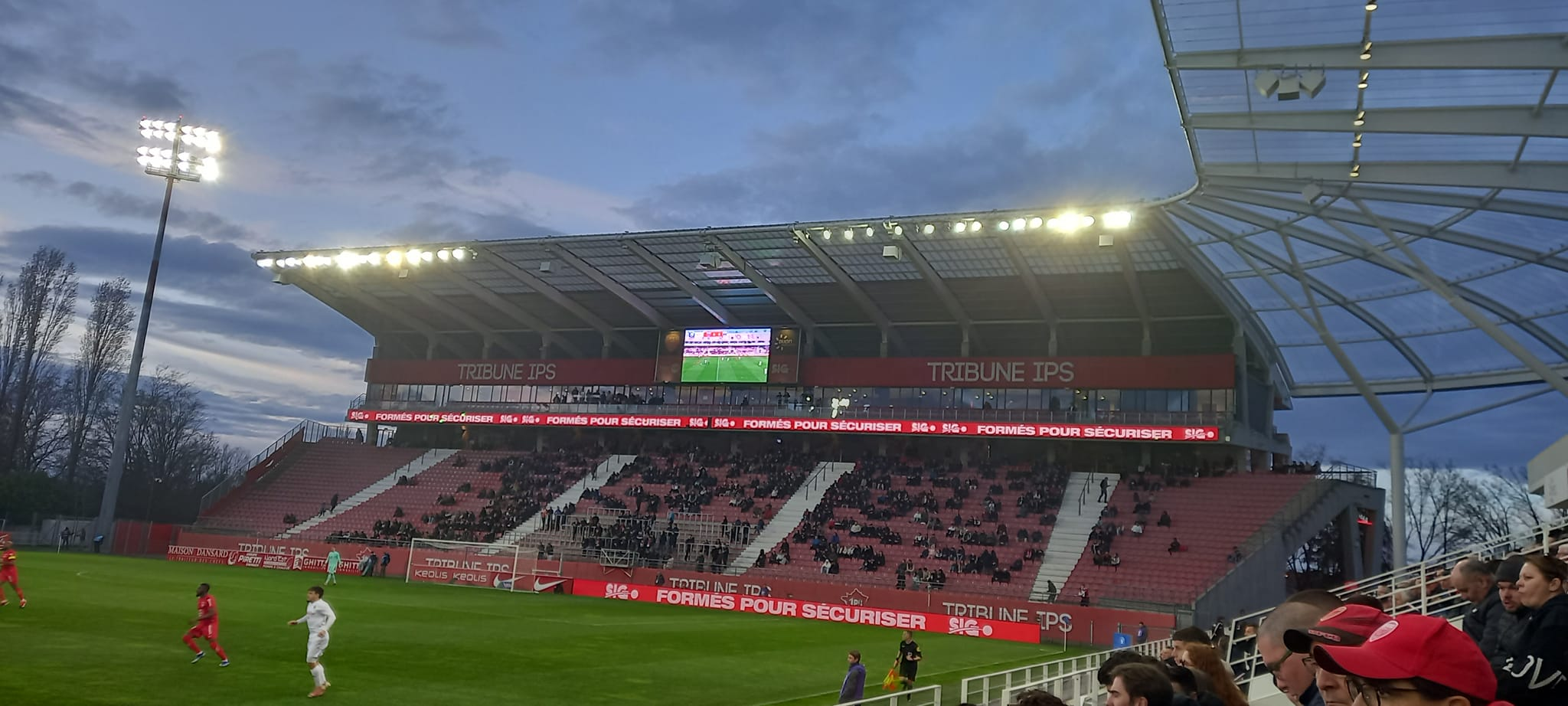
Stade Gaston Gérard

Dijon Football Côte-d'Or, also known as Dijon FCO, DFCO or Dijon, is an association football club based in Dijon, France. The club was formed in 1998 after a merger between two local clubs in the city (Cercle Sportif Laïque Dijonnais and Dijon FC). They play their home matches at Stade Gaston Gérard.

== Summary ==
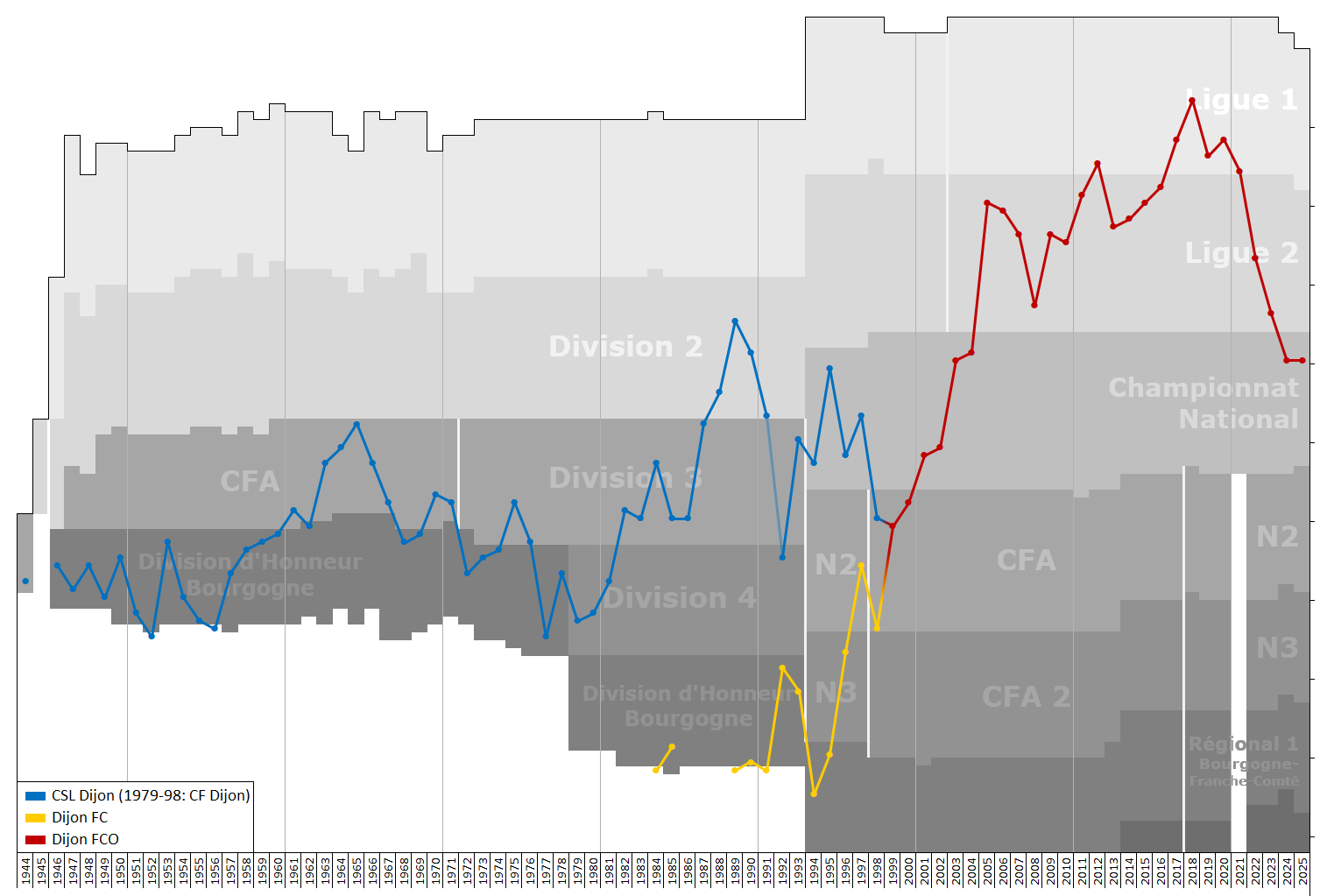
End-season table rankings for Dijon Football Côte-d'Or and its predecessors.

Their first season as a club was 1998–99 in the Championnat de France Amateur, the fourth tier of French football. The club achieved their first promotion in 2000, finishing 2nd in the Championnat de France Amateur Group A. They were promoted to Ligue 2 in 2004, finishing 3rd in the Championnat National. They achieved promotion to Ligue 1 for the first time in 2011 after finishing 3rd in Ligue 2, before being relegated the following season. In 2016, they finished 2nd in Ligue 2 and returned to Ligue 1, before being relegated in 2021. In 2023, they were relegated to the Championnat National, before being promoted again in 2026, after the club won their first ever league title.

The club has reached the semi-final of the Coupe de France once during the 2003–04 season and reached the quarter-final of the Coupe de la Ligue once during the 2011–12 season. The club has spent a total of six seasons in Ligue 1, the top tier of French football, with their best season in 2017–18, finishing in 11th place. Their highest average attendance was 13,597 during the 2011–12 season in Ligue 1 and their highest home attendance was 15,160 on 14 October 2017 vs Paris Saint-Germain. They beat Paris Saint-Germain for the first and so far only time on 1 November 2019.

== Key ==
Champions	Promoted	Relegated

- L1 = Ligue 1
- L2 = Ligue 2
- CN = Championnat National
- CFA = Championnat de France Amateur
- Pos = Final position
- Pld = Matches played
- W = Matches won
- D = Matches drawn
- L = Matches lost
- GF = Goals for
- GA = Goals against
- GD = Goal difference
- Pts = Points
- R1 = First round
- R2 = Second round
- R3 = Third round
- R5 = Fifth round
- R6 = Sixth round
- R7 = Seventh round
- R8 = Eighth round
- R64 = Round of 64
- R32 = Round of 32
- R16 = Round of 16
- QF = Quarter-finals
- SF = Semi-finals

== Seasons ==
Season	Division	Level	League									Coupe de France	Coupe de la Ligue	Attendance		Ref.	Notes
Season	Division	Level	Pos	Pld	W	D	L	GF	GA	GD	Pts	Coupe de France	Coupe de la Ligue	Average	Highest	Ref.	Notes
1998–99	CFA	4	5th	34	14	11	9	65	41	+24	87	R32		—N/a	—N/a		
1999–2000	CFA	4	2nd	34	21	6	7	62	33	+29	103	R6		—N/a	—N/a		
2000–01	CN	3	16th	38	9	15	14	43	53	−10	42	R5		1,863	—N/a		
2001–02	CN	3	15th	38	12	6	20	40	53	−13	42	R7		1,570	2,717		
2002–03	CN	3	4th	38	17	10	11	65	59	+6	61	R32		1,708	3,199		
2003–04	CN	3	3rd	38	19	7	12	49	36	+13	64	SF		2,718	7,929		
2004–05	L2	2	4th	38	14	15	9	44	34	+10	57	R7	R16	4,799	6,704		
2005–06	L2	2	5th	38	16	12	10	47	32	+15	60	R16	R7	4,780	7,461		
2006–07	L2	2	8th	38	14	12	12	44	47	−3	54	R7	R16	5,150	7,049		
2007–08	L2	2	17th	38	9	15	14	32	51	−19	42	QF	R2	4,891	7,252		
2008–09	L2	2	8th	38	14	10	14	43	46	−3	52	R16	R1	4,053	4,637		
2009–10	L2	2	9th	38	12	15	11	52	46	+6	51	R8	R2	5,421	7,456		
2010–11	L2	2	3rd	38	17	11	10	55	40	+10	62	R8	R1	7,457	14,405		
2011–12	L1	1	19th	38	9	9	20	38	63	−25	36	R16	QF	13,597	15,081		
2012–13	L2	2	7th	38	15	14	9	52	49	+3	59	R7	R2	8,708	12,126		
2013–14	L2	2	6th	38	14	15	9	53	42	+11	57	R32	R1	8,272	10,869		
2014–15	L2	2	4th	38	17	10	11	44	34	+10	61	R32	R2	8,709	12,036		
2015–16	L2	2	2nd	38	20	10	8	62	36	+26	70	R8	R16	8,108	10,689		
2016–17	L1	1	16th	38	8	13	17	46	58	−12	37	R32	R3	10,126	13,416		
2017–18	L1	1	11th	38	13	9	16	55	73	−18	48	R64	R3	12,228	15,160		
2018–19	L1	1	18th	38	9	7	22	31	60	−29	34	QF	R16	13,041	15,117		
2019–20	L1	1	16th	28	7	9	12	27	37	−10	30	QF	R3	12,705	15,061		(Note: The 2019–20 Ligue 1 season was suspended on 13 March 2020 due to the Covid-19 pandemic. On 28 April 2020, it was announced that the season would not resume.)
2020–21	L1	1	20th	38	4	9	25	25	73	−48	21	R64		3,460	4,398		(Note: The LFP on 18 September 2019 voted to suspend the Coupe de la Ligue indefinitely after 2019–20 in order to reduce the season schedule.) (Note: Only played four home matches in front of spectators, the rest were played behind closed doors due to the COVID-19 pandemic.)
2021–22	L2	2	11th	38	13	8	17	48	53	−5	47	R64		6,495	11,301		
2022–23	L2	2	18th	38	10	12	16	38	43	−5	42	R7		7,691	14,210		
2023–24	CN	3	4th	34	15	9	10	50	41	+9	54	R8		5,121	7,729		
2024–25	CN	3	4th	32	12	11	9	37	35	+2	47	R64		5,025	7,273		
2025–26	CN	3	1st	32	18	11	3	52	25	+27	65	R6		TBD	14,550		
