= Black Belgians =

Afrobelgen Afrobelges Afrobelgier
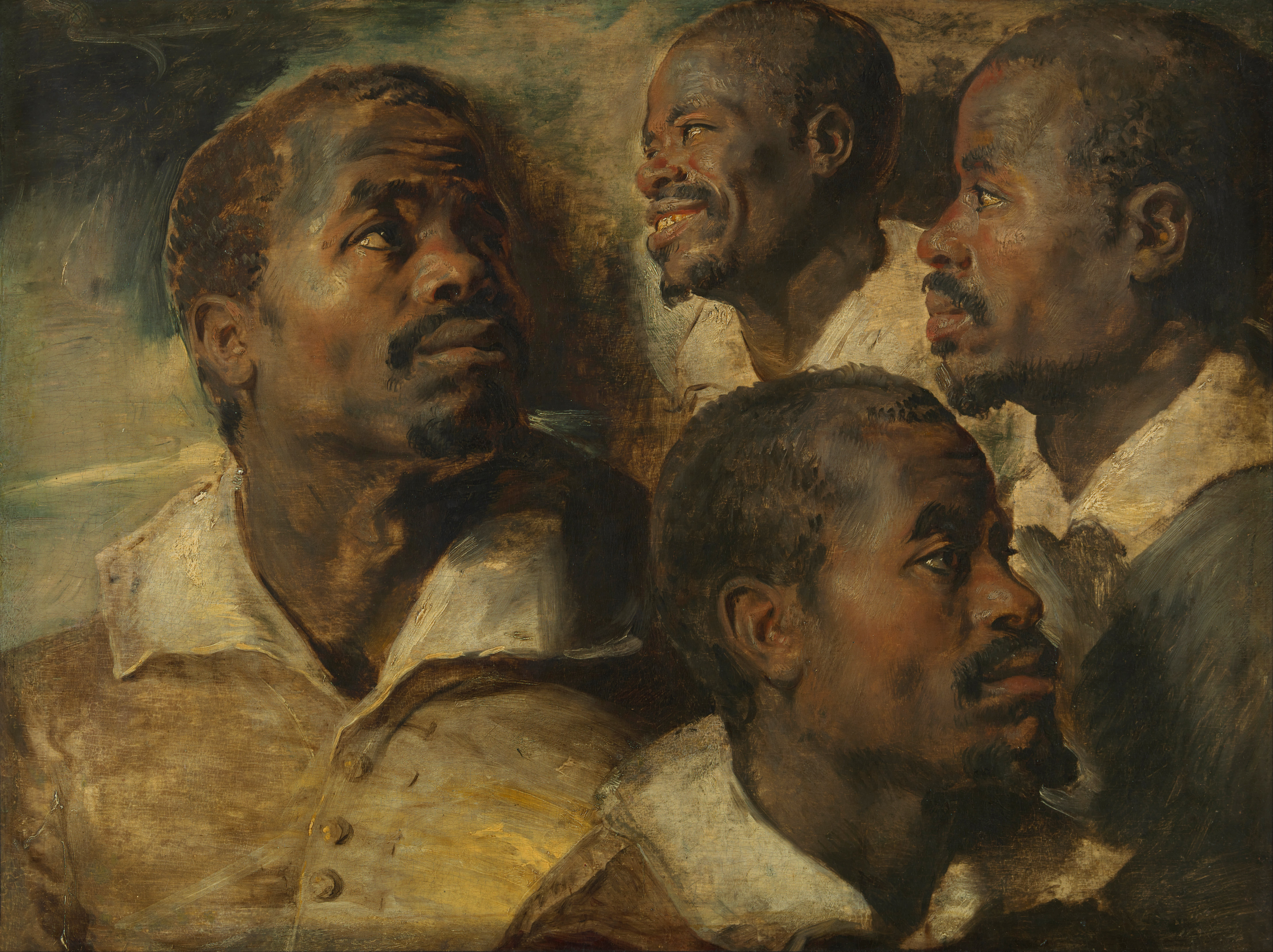
- Four Studies of the Head of a Moor by Rubens, c. 1615. The unidentified subject of the oil sketch was probably a resident of Antwerp.

Regions with significant populations
- Throughout Belgium

Languages
- Dutch • French • German • Languages of Africa

Religion
- Christianity • Islam • Traditional African religions • Non-adherence

Afro-Belgians (Dutch: Afrobelgen; French: Afrobelges; German: Afrobelgier) or Black Belgians, are defined as Belgians of Sub-Saharan African descent.

A total of 358,268 Sub-Saharan Africans lived in Belgium in 2023, comprising 3.06% of the population, according to Statistics Belgium. 95,282 (27% of the total Sub-Saharan African population) lived in Brussels.

Most Sub-Saharan Africans in Belgium originate from Cameroon, Mali, Guinea, Senegal, Democratic Republic of the Congo, Republic of the Congo, Rwanda, and Burundi. The Brussels neighborhoods of Ixelles and Matonge have large Black populations.

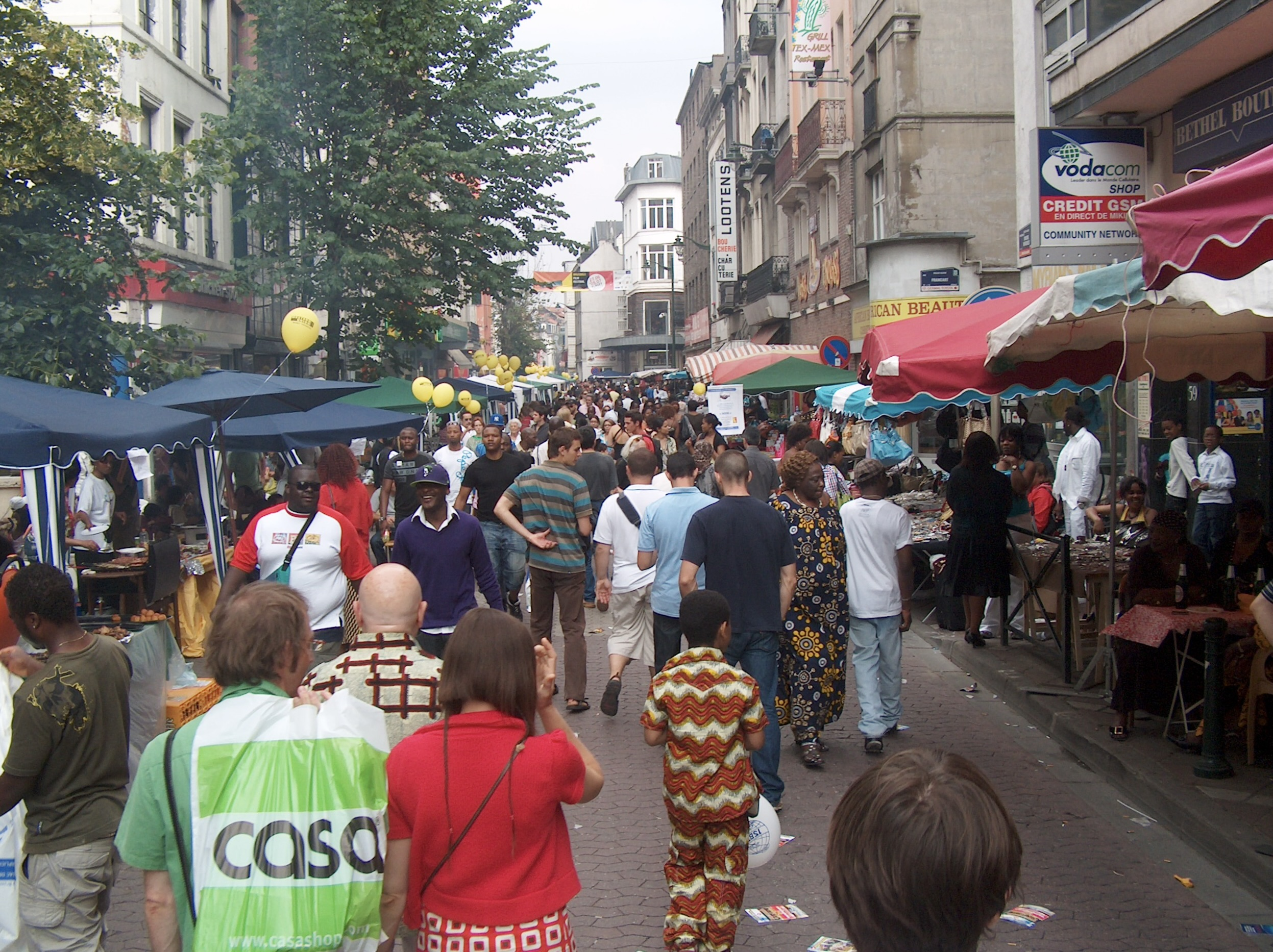
A street scene in Matonge, one of Belgium's most diverse neighborhoods with a large African population (2009)

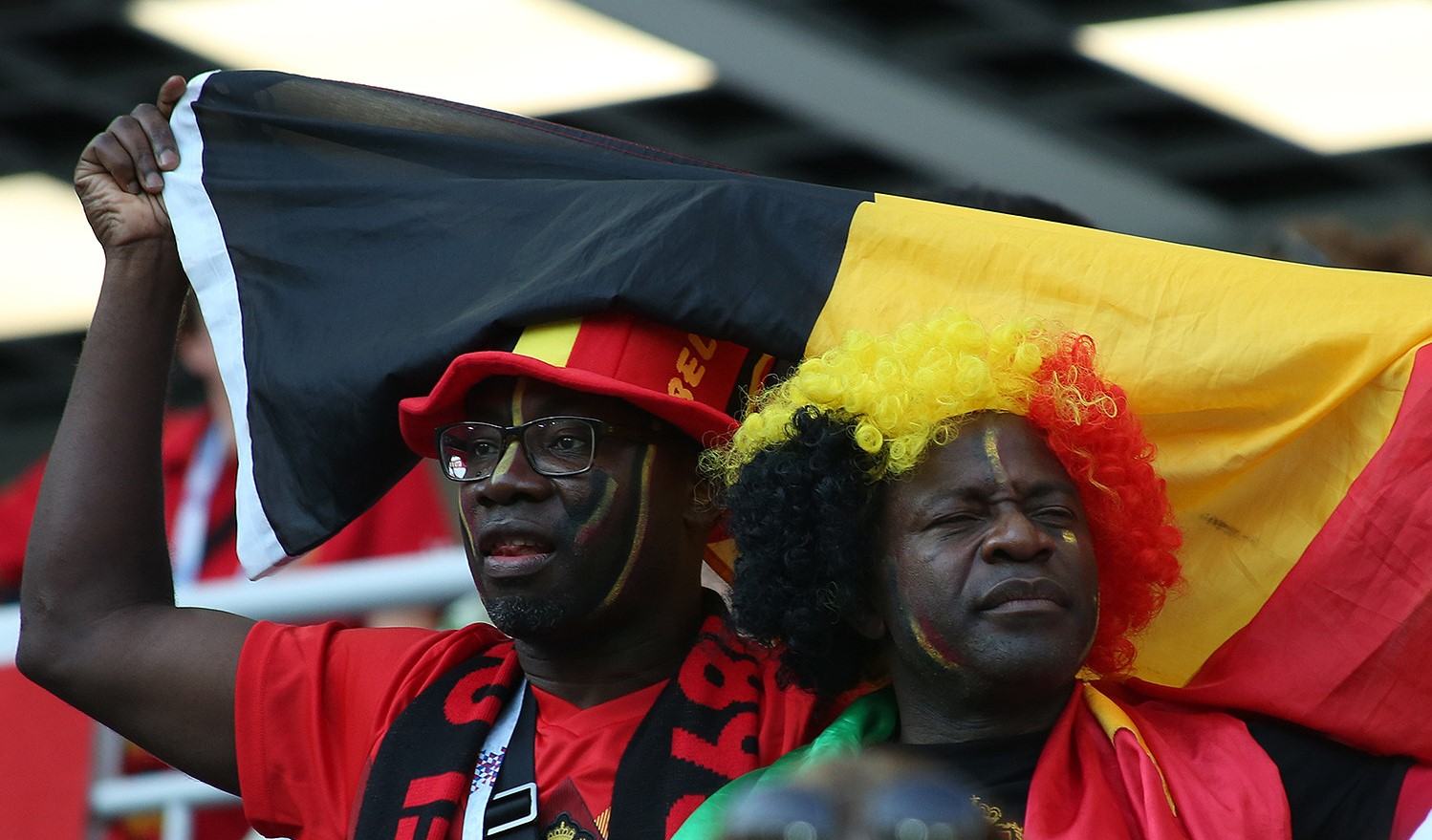
Two supporters of the Belgian national football team at the 2018 FIFA World Cup

== Belgium national team ==
In 2017, 19 out of 52 total players in the men's Belgium national football team were of African origin.

== Notable Afro-Belgians ==
=== Football players ===
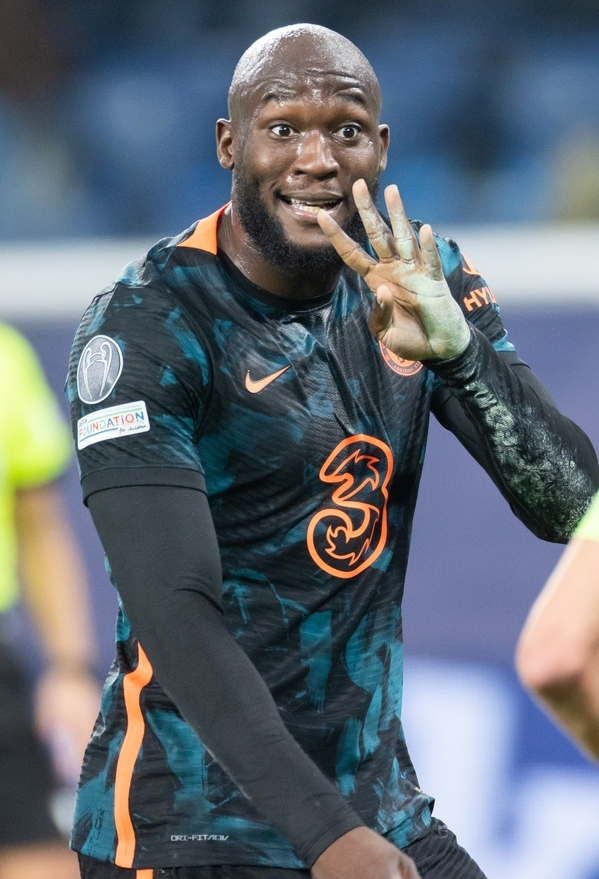
Romelu Lukaku, a football player of Congolese descent

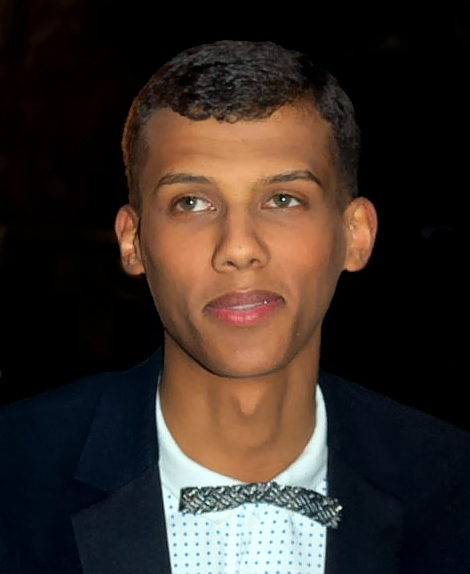
Stromae, a singer of Flemish and Rwandese descent

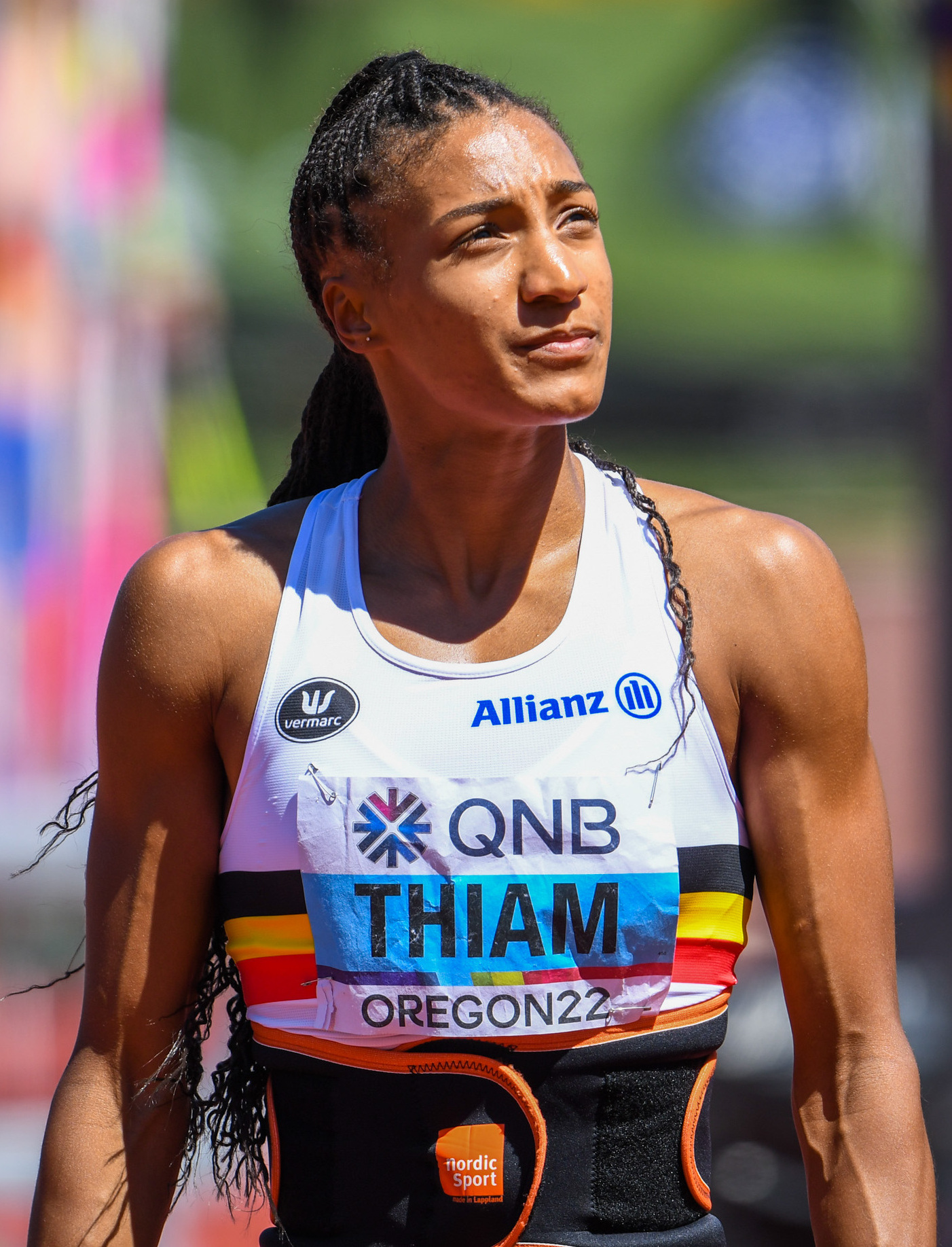
Nafissatou Thiam, an athlete of Belgian and Senegalese descent

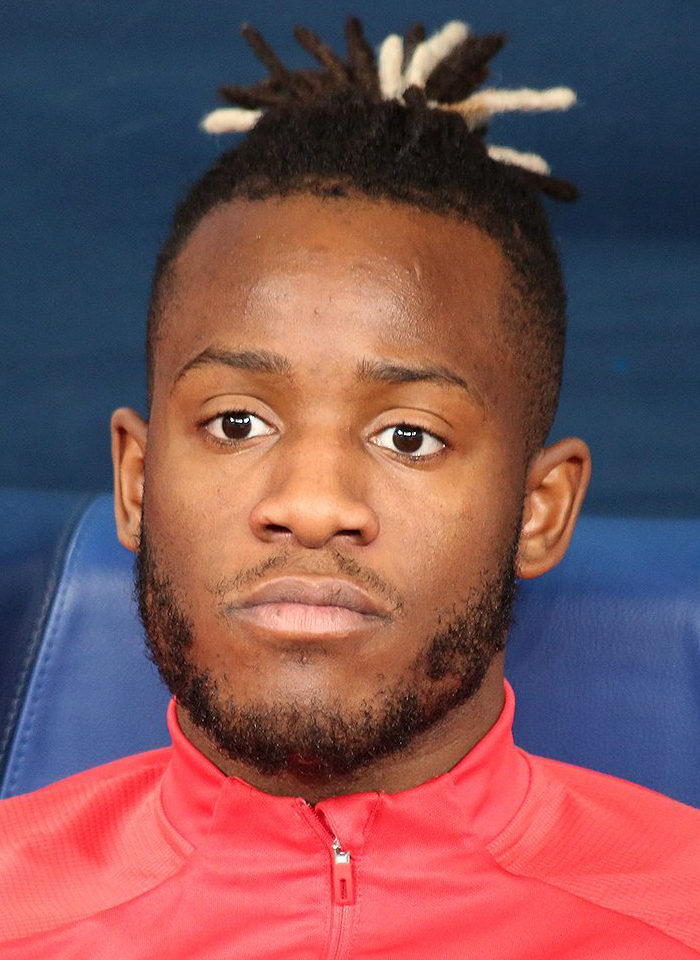
Michy Batshuayi, a football player of Congolese descent

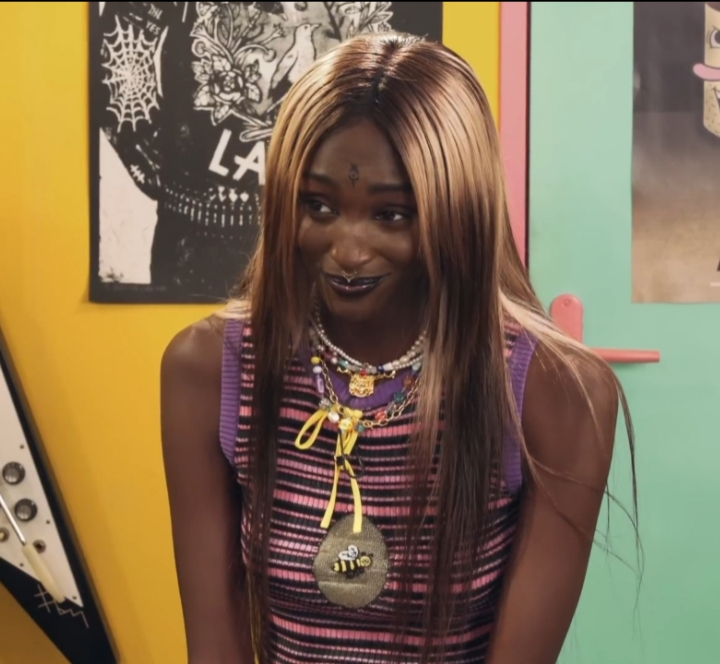
Marie-Pierra Kakoma, professionally known as Lous and the Yakuza, a singer rapper of Congolese and Rwandese descent

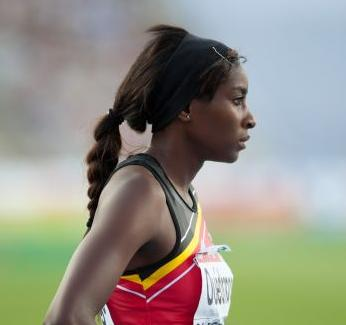
Élodie Ouédraogo, a retired sprinter of Burkinabé descent

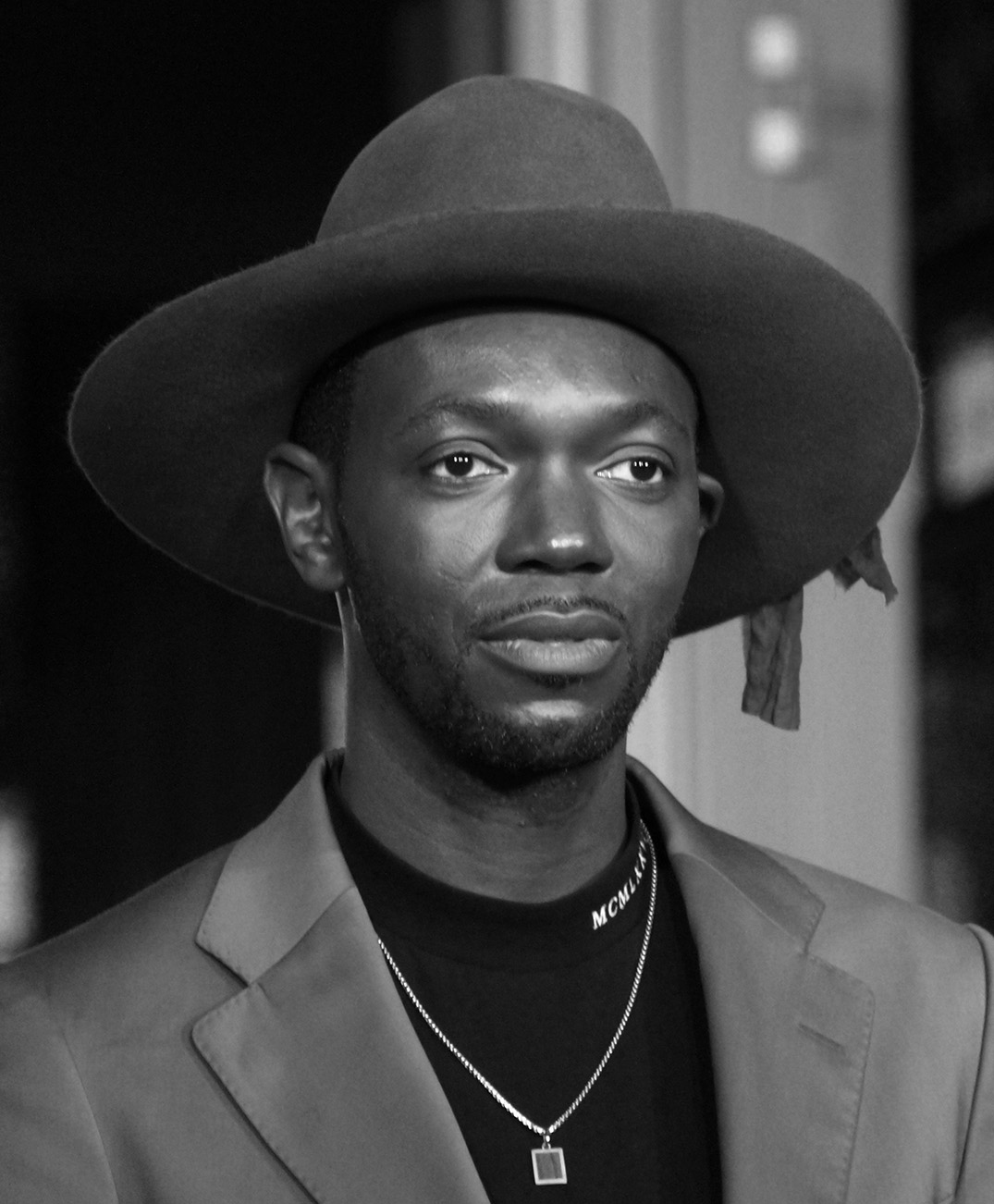
Baloji, a rapper and singer of Congolese descent

- Aster Vranckx
- Koni De Winter
- Jérémy Doku
- Julien Duranville
- Kossivi Amédédjisso
- Christian Kabasele
- Jackson Tchatchoua
- Lamisha Musonda
- Charly Musonda
- Cyril Ngonge
- Dylan Damraoui
- Eric Asomani
- Ibrahima Cissé
- Isaac Asare
- Michy Batshuayi
- Manuel Benson
- Christian Benteke
- Jonathan Benteke
- Mayola Biboko
- Anthony Vanden Borre
- Dedryck Boyata
- Jonathan Buatu
- Luis Pedro Cavanda
- Mousa Dembélé
- Jason Denayer
- Julien Ngoy
- Arnaud Djoum
- Emmanuel Eboué
- Nathan Kabasele
- Vincent Kompany
- Cheikhou Kouyaté
- Mulopo Kudimbana
- Roland Lamah
- Aaron Leya Iseka
- Jordan Lukaku
- Romelu Lukaku
- Roger Lukaku
- Junior Malanda
- Ilombe Mboyo
- Gaby Mudingayi
- Maecky Ngombo
- Denis Odoi
- Marvin Ogunjimi
- Funso Ojo
- Divock Origi
- Ebrima Ebou Sillah
- Youri Tielemans
- Bertin Tokéné
- Clinton Mata
- Cyriel Dessers
- Denzel Jubitana
- Mike Mampuya
- Vadis Odjidja-Ofoe
- Johan Bakayoko
- Tyrese Omotoye
- Beni Badibanga
- Kéres Masangu
- Antef Tsoungui
- Maecky Ngombo
- Gerard
- Samuel Bastien
- Killian Sardella
- Koni De Winter
- Mario Stroeykens
- Nathan de Medina
- Regillio Tuur
- Loïs Openda
- Igor Vetokele
- Amadou Onana
- Émile Mpenza
- Floribert N'Galula
- Pieter Mbemba
- Ryan Mmaee
- Samy Mmaee
- Scott Bitsindou
- Senna Miangué
- Seydina Diarra
- Jacky Donkor
- Zinho Gano
- Orel Mangala
- Pierre Dwomoh
- Roméo Lavia
- Thierry Lutonda
- Camil Mmaee
- Diego Moreira
- Mike Trésor
- Ryan Sanusi
- Faris Haroun
- Nadjim Haroun
- Axel Witsel

=== Other sports ===
- Corliss Waitman
- Naomi Schiff, racing driver
- D. J. Mbenga, basketball player
- Élodie Ouédraogo, track athlete
- Nafissatou Thiam, heptathlon athlete
- Sugar Jackson, boxer

=== Politicians ===
- Assita Kanko, politician, member of the European Parliament
- Pierre Kompany, politician, the first black mayor in Belgium, father of football player Vincent Kompany
- Wouter Van Bellingen, politician and the first black alderman in Belgium

=== Arts and music ===
- Ronny Mosuse, singer-songwriter
- Stromae, singer-songwriter
- Baloji (rapper), rapper
- Damso, rapper
- Shay, rapper
- Coely, singer, rapper
- Fatou Samba, singer, rapper
- Ya Kid K, singer, rapper
- Marie Daulne, singer (Zap Mama)
- Leki, singer
- Lous and the Yakuza, singer, model
- Viktor Lazlo, singer, writer
- Roland Gunst, film director
- Martha Canga Antonio, actress
- Eric Kabongo, actor
- Marc Zinga, actor
