= 2004–05 Stade Brestois 29 season =

Brest
2004–05 season
- Head coach: Albert Rust
- Stadium: Stade Francis-Le Blé
- Ligue 2: 9th
- Coupe de France: Round of 64
- Coupe de la Ligue: Round of 32
- Top goalscorer: League: Robert Malm (11); All: Robert Malm (11)
- Average home league attendance: 7,339

The 2004–05 season was Stade Brestois 29's 55th season in existence and the club's first season back in the second division of French football. In addition to the domestic league, Brest participated in this season's editions of the Coupe de France, and the Coupe de la Ligue.

== Competitions ==
=== Overall record ===
Competition	First match	Last match	Starting round	Final position	Record							
Competition	First match	Last match	Starting round	Final position	Pld	W	D	L	GF	GA	GD	Win %
Ligue 2	6 August 2004	27 May 2005	Matchday 1	9th	38	13	16	9	38	34	+4	34.21
Coupe de France	20 November 2004	7 January 2005	Seventh round	Round of 64	3	2	0	1	5	2	+3	66.67
Coupe de la Ligue	5 October 2004	9 November 2004	Round of 32	Round of 32	2	1	0	1	2	2	+0	50.00
Total					43	16	16	11	45	38	+7	37.21

Source: Soccerway

=== Ligue 2 ===
==== League table ====
Pos	Team	Pld	W	D	L	GF	GA	GD	Pts
7	Guingamp	38	15	11	12	53	43	+10	56
8	Montpellier	38	15	10	13	44	39	+5	55
9	Brest	38	13	16	9	38	34	+4	55
10	Lorient	38	14	8	16	47	51	−4	50
11	Grenoble	38	12	12	14	45	50	−5	48

Source: Ligue 2

==== Results summary ====
Overall								Home						Away					
Pld	W	D	L	GF	GA	GD	Pts	W	D	L	GF	GA	GD	W	D	L	GF	GA	GD
38	13	16	9	38	34	+4	55	9	9	1	24	14	+10	4	7	8	14	20	−6

Source: Ligue 2

==== Results by round ====
Round	1	2	3	4	5	6	7	8	9	10	11	12	13	14	15	16	17	18	19	20	21	22	23	24	25	26	27	28	29	30	31	32	33	34	35	36	37	38
Ground	H	A	H	A	H	A	H	A	H	A	H	H	A	H	A	H	A	H	A	H	A	H	A	H	A	H	A	H	A	A	H	A	H	A	H	A	H	A
Result	W	W	W	L	L	W	W	D	D	D	D	W	D	D	L	D	L	W	L	D	D	D	D	W	D	W	L	W	W	L	W	W	D	D	D	L	D	L
Position	3	3	2	3	4	1	1	1	1	1	3	2	2	2	2	4	5	4	5	8	8	8	9	8	8	6	9	6	5	6	4	4	4	5	4	5	7	9

Source: Ligue 2
A = Away; H = Home; W = Win; D = Draw; L = Loss

==== Matches ====
6 August 2004 1	Brest	3–2	Nancy	Brest
--:-- CEST (UTC+2)				Stadium: Stade Francis-Le Blé

12 August 2004 2	Guingamp	1–2	Brest	Guingamp
--:-- CEST (UTC+2)

17 August 2004 3	Brest	1–0	Niort	Brest
--:-- CEST (UTC+2)				Stadium: Stade Francis-Le Blé

26 August 2004 4	Amiens	1–0	Brest	Amiens
--:-- CEST (UTC+2)

27 August 2004 5	Brest	1–2	Clermont	Brest
--:-- CEST (UTC+2)				Stadium: Stade Francis-Le Blé

3 September 2004 6	Créteil	2–3	Brest	Créteil
--:-- CEST (UTC+2)

12 September 2004 7	Brest	4–2	Reims	Brest
--:-- CEST (UTC+2)				Stadium: Stade Francis-Le Blé

17 September 2004 8	Le Mans	1–1	Brest	Le Mans
--:-- CEST (UTC+2)

21 September 2004 9	Brest	0–0	Gueugnon	Brest
--:-- CEST (UTC+2)				Stadium: Stade Francis-Le Blé

24 September 2004 10	Le Havre	0–0	Brest	Le Havre
--:-- CEST (UTC+2)

1 October 2004 11	Brest	1–1	Grenoble	Brest
--:-- CEST (UTC+2)				Stadium: Stade Francis-Le Blé

15 October 2004 12	Brest	2–1	Laval	Brest
--:-- CEST (UTC+2)				Stadium: Stade Francis-Le Blé

24 October 2004 13	Sedan	0–0	Brest	Sedan
--:-- CEST (UTC+2)

29 October 2004 14	Brest	0–0	Châteauroux	Brest
--:-- CEST (UTC+2)				Stadium: Stade Francis-Le Blé

5 November 2004 15	Montpellier	1–0	Brest	Montpellier
--:-- CET (UTC+1)

15 November 2004 16	Brest	1–1	Dijon	Brest
--:-- CEST (UTC+2)				Stadium: Stade Francis-Le Blé

26 November 2004 17	Troyes	2–0	Brest	Troyes
--:-- CET (UTC+1)

3 December 2004 18	Brest	1–0	Angers	Brest
--:-- CEST (UTC+2)				Stadium: Stade Francis-Le Blé

16 December 2004 19	Lorient	3–0	Brest	Lorient
--:-- CET (UTC+1)

11 January 2005 20	Brest	2–2	Guingamp	Brest
--:-- CEST (UTC+2)				Stadium: Stade Francis-Le Blé

14 January 2005 21	Niort	1–1	Brest	Niort
--:-- CET (UTC+1)

21 January 2005 22	Brest	1–1	Amiens	Brest
--:-- CEST (UTC+2)				Stadium: Stade Francis-Le Blé

25 January 2005 23	Clermont	0–0	Brest	Clermont-Ferrand
--:-- CET (UTC+1)

28 January 2005 24	Brest	1–0	Créteil	Brest
--:-- CEST (UTC+2)				Stadium: Stade Francis-Le Blé

4 February 2005 25	Reims	0–0	Brest	Reims
--:-- CET (UTC+1)

21 February 2005 26	Brest	1–0	Le Mans	Brest
--:-- CEST (UTC+2)				Stadium: Stade Francis-Le Blé

25 February 2005 27	Gueugnon	1–0	Brest	Gueugnon
--:-- CET (UTC+1)

4 March 2005 28	Brest	1–0	Le Havre	Brest
--:-- CEST (UTC+2)				Stadium: Stade Francis-Le Blé

11 March 2005 29	Grenoble	0–2	Brest	Grenoble
--:-- CET (UTC+1)

18 March 2005 30	Laval	2–1	Brest	Laval
--:-- CET (UTC+1)

1 April 2005 31	Brest	2–0	Sedan	Brest
--:-- CEST (UTC+2)				Stadium: Stade Francis-Le Blé

8 April 2005 32	Châteauroux	1–2	Brest	Châteauroux
--:-- CET (UTC+1)

15 April 2005 33	Brest	1–1	Montpellier	Brest
--:-- CEST (UTC+2)				Stadium: Stade Francis-Le Blé

22 April 2005 34	Dijon	2–2	Brest	Dijon
--:-- CET (UTC+1)

9 May 2005 35	Brest	1–1	Troyes	Brest
--:-- CEST (UTC+2)				Stadium: Stade Francis-Le Blé

13 May 2005 36	Amiens	1–0	Brest	Amiens
--:-- CET (UTC+1)

20 May 2005 37	Brest	0–0	Lorient	Brest
--:-- CEST (UTC+2)				Stadium: Stade Francis-Le Blé

27 May 2005 38	Nancy	1–0	Brest	Tomblaine
--:-- CET (UTC+1)

=== Coupe de France ===
20 November 2004 Seventh round	Stade Plabennécois	0–3	Brest
--:-- CEST (UTC+2)

11 December 2004 Eighth round	SJA Poiré-sur-Vie	1–2	Brest	Poiré-sur-Vie
18:00 CEST (UTC+2)		Report		Attendance: 3,354; Referee: Feuillade

7 January 2005 Round of 64	Rennes	1–0 (a.e.t.)	Brest	Rennes
21:00 CEST (UTC+2)	Monterrubio (penalty missed) 25'; Morestin 120' (o.g.)			Stadium: Stade de la Route de Lorient; Attendance: 14,717; Referee: Bertrand Layec

=== Coupe de la Ligue ===
5 October 2004 Round of 64	Wasquehal	0–1	Brest	Wasquehal
--:-- CEST (UTC+2)

9 November 2004 Round of 32	Brest	1–2	Sochaux	Brest
21:00 CEST (UTC+2)	Forest 4'		Mathieu 29'; Pitau 87'	Stadium: Stade Francis-Le Blé; Attendance: 8,254; Referee: Patrick L'hermite
