= Sergio Rojas =

Sergio Rojas can refer to:

- Sergio Rojas (Argentine footballer)
- Sergio Rojas (Paraguayan footballer)
