= 2006–07 Ligue 2 =

68th season of the second-tier football league in France

Ligue 2
- Season: 2006–07
- Champions: FC Metz
- Promoted: SM Caen; RC Strasbourg
- Relegated: US Créteil-Lusitanos; FC Istres; Tours FC
- Top goalscorer: (France) Jean-Michel Lesage and (Ivory Coast) Kandia Traoré (18)

The Ligue 2 season 2006/2007, organised by the LFP was won by FC Metz and saw the promotions of FC Metz, SM Caen and RC Strasbourg, whereas FC Nantes Atlantique, CS Sedan Ardennes and Troyes AC were relegated from Ligue 1.

== 20 participating teams ==
- Ajaccio
- Amiens
- Bastia
- Brest
- Caen
- Châteauroux
- Créteil
- Dijon
- Grenoble
- Gueugnon
- Guingamp
- Istres
- Le Havre
- Libourne
- Metz
- Montpellier
- Niort
- Reims
- Strasbourg
- Tours

== League table ==
Pos	Team	Pld	W	D	L	GF	GA	GD	Pts	Promotion or Relegation
1	Metz (C, P)	38	22	10	6	54	22	+32	76	Promotion to Ligue 1
2	Caen (P)	38	19	14	5	65	40	+25	71	Promotion to Ligue 1
3	Strasbourg (P)	38	19	13	6	47	33	+14	70	Promotion to Ligue 1
4	Amiens	38	21	6	11	57	42	+15	69	
5	Grenoble	38	15	14	9	51	39	+12	59	
6	Le Havre	38	15	11	12	52	38	+14	56	
7	Châteauroux	38	15	9	14	42	44	−2	54	
8	Dijon	38	14	12	12	44	47	−3	54	
9	Bastia	38	14	11	13	52	49	+3	53	
10	Gueugnon	38	13	9	16	47	52	−5	48	
11	Reims	38	12	11	15	43	46	−3	47	
12	Ajaccio	38	12	11	15	44	50	−6	47	
13	Guingamp	38	11	13	14	45	44	+1	46	
14	Brest	38	10	15	13	40	40	0	45	
15	Montpellier	38	11	11	16	41	48	−7	44	
16	Niort	38	10	14	14	36	44	−8	44	
17	Libourne-Saint-Seurin	38	12	8	18	43	52	−9	44	
18	Créteil (R)	38	9	13	16	33	50	−17	40	Relegation to Championnat National
19	Istres (R)	38	8	11	19	35	63	−28	35	Relegation to Championnat National
20	Tours (R)	38	6	8	24	30	58	−28	26	Relegation to Championnat National

Source: Ligue 2
(C) Champions; (P) Promoted; (R) Relegated

== Results ==
Home \ Away	ACA	AMI	BAS	BRS	CAE	CHA	CRE	DIJ	GRE	GUE	GUI	IST	LHA	LIB	MET	MHS	NRT	REI	STR	TOU
Ajaccio		3–1	0–1	2–1	0–0	2–3	5–0	3–0	3–1	1–1	0–0	2–0	0–0	1–0	2–1	0–2	1–1	2–1	2–2	0–1
Amiens	1–1		1–0	2–0	2–2	3–1	1–0	0–4	0–1	2–0	3–1	2–1	2–0	1–1	0–2	4–1	1–0	1–0	1–0	3–0
Bastia	4–1	2–2		4–2	2–0	1–2	1–2	1–1	0–0	0–1	0–0	4–1	1–1	3–2	1–0	1–0	4–1	1–0	1–2	2–0
Brest	0–1	1–1	3–1		2–2	0–0	4–1	0–0	1–0	2–1	2–3	0–0	2–0	2–2	0–1	0–0	1–0	3–0	1–1	1–1
Caen	4–0	3–1	2–0	1–0		1–0	1–0	3–2	0–1	1–1	1–1	4–0	1–1	2–1	0–0	0–0	4–0	2–1	2–2	1–0
Châteauroux	2–1	3–1	1–2	1–0	1–1		1–0	2–1	2–2	2–1	1–0	0–0	2–2	0–1	0–1	0–1	0–0	1–1	1–1	3–1
Créteil	0–0	0–2	1–0	0–2	4–3	1–3		1–1	1–1	0–0	0–0	1–0	0–1	1–0	1–1	1–0	3–1	1–1	0–2	4–3
Dijon	2–2	1–2	1–1	1–1	0–2	2–0	1–1		1–1	1–0	2–1	1–0	2–1	0–1	0–3	1–1	2–1	1–0	3–1	2–1
Grenoble	2–0	0–1	1–1	0–0	1–1	0–1	3–1	2–1		2–2	1–0	3–0	2–1	2–1	1–1	3–2	4–1	5–1	1–1	2–1
Gueugnon	1–0	2–1	4–2	4–2	0–1	3–0	1–1	0–2	0–0		2–0	3–3	2–1	1–3	0–1	3–0	0–1	0–0	0–1	2–1
Guingamp	1–1	2–3	4–0	1–1	1–3	1–1	2–1	2–2	2–2	6–1		3–0	1–2	2–1	0–2	1–0	1–0	1–0	1–1	3–1
Istres	1–4	1–3	2–2	1–1	1–2	3–1	0–0	2–2	3–0	0–1	1–0		0–1	2–2	0–0	1–2	1–0	2–2	3–2	2–1
Le Havre	4–1	1–3	2–0	0–1	2–2	1–0	2–1	1–2	1–1	6–1	2–0	1–0		2–0	1–1	3–0	2–2	1–0	0–1	3–0
Libourne-St-Seurin	1–0	1–1	2–4	3–2	1–2	0–1	0–2	0–1	2–1	2–1	1–1	1–2	0–0		0–2	2–2	3–1	2–3	1–0	1–0
Metz	1–0	1–0	2–1	0–0	2–0	2–0	2–0	5–0	1–2	1–2	1–0	3–0	1–0	1–0		2–1	0–0	2–2	4–1	2–1
Montpellier	1–2	1–2	4–0	0–0	1–2	1–3	1–1	3–0	1–0	0–3	1–1	4–0	2–1	0–1	1–1		2–1	2–0	0–0	1–0
Niort	3–0	2–0	0–0	1–0	2–2	2–0	2–1	2–1	2–1	1–1	0–1	0–0	0–0	2–0	1–1	1–1		0–0	2–2	0–0
Reims	4–1	1–0	1–1	2–0	2–2	0–2	0–0	1–0	0–1	1–0	1–0	1–2	3–2	1–1	2–0	4–1	2–3		2–0	2–1
Strasbourg	0–0	1–0	1–1	1–0	3–2	2–0	1–0	0–0	1–0	2–1	2–0	2–0	1–1	0–1	2–1	2–0	2–0	1–0		2–1
Tours	1–0	0–2	0–3	1–2	2–3	2–1	1–1	0–1	1–1	2–1	1–1	2–0	0–2	1–2	0–1	1–1	1–0	0–0	0–0	

Source: Ligue 2
Legend: Blue = home team win; Yellow = draw; Red = away team win.

== Top goalscorers ==
Rank	Player	Club	Goals
1	(France) Jean-Michel Lesage	Le Havre	18
1	(Ivory Coast) Kandia Traoré	Le Havre	18
3	(Senegal) Babacar Gueye	Metz	16
4	(France) Yoan Gouffran	Caen	15
4	(France) Cédric Fauré	Reims	15
6	(France) Jean-Jacques Mandrichi	Ajaccio	14
7	(Croatia) Zvonimir Deranja	Libourne-Saint-Seurin	13
8	(France) Mathieu Scarpelli	Ajaccio	12
8	(Algeria) Nassim Akrour	Grenoble	12
8	(Senegal) Papiss Cissé	Metz	12

== Attendance ==
#	Club	Average attendance	Best attendance	Against
1	SM Caen	16,202	20,886	Le Havre AC
2	RC Strasbourg	15,569	27,102	FC Metz
3	FC Metz	12,287	22,680	RC Strasbourg
4	Le Havre AC	10,194	14,786	RC Strasbourg
5	En Avant Guingamp	8,899	11,863	Dijon FCO
6	Amiens SC	7,841	11,305	Le Havre AC
7	Montpellier HSC	7,058	18,403	Grenoble Foot 38
8	LB Châteauroux	6,842	11,175	En Avant Guingamp
9	Stade de Reims	6,484	8,678	FC Metz
10	Stade Brestois	5,961	8,969	Stade de Reims
11	Grenoble Foot 38	5,773	6,860	RC Strasbourg
12	Dijon FCO	5,149	7,049	RC Strasbourg
13	Chamois Niortais FC	4,796	9,053	Stade Brestois
14	Tours FC	4,379	7,675	SM Caen
15	FC Istres	4,004	5,961	AC Ajaccio
16	US Créteil-Lusitanos	3,512	5,591	Amiens SC
17	FC Gueugnon	3,409	6,947	FC Libourne-Saint-Seurin
18	SC Bastia	3,300	5,352	AC Ajaccio
19	FC Libourne-Saint-Seurin	2,338	4,073	SM Caen
20	AC Ajaccio	2,265	5,246	SC Bastia

Against: Team hosted for the best attendance
