= 2004–05 Dijon FCO season =

Dijon FCO
2004–05 season
- Manager: Rudi Garcia
- Stadium: Stade Gaston Gérard
- Ligue 2: 4th
- Coupe de France: Seventh round
- Coupe de la Ligue: Round of 16
Home colours	Away colours

The 2004–05 season was Dijon FCO's seventh season in existence and the club's first ever season in the second division of French football. In addition to the domestic league, Dijon participated in this season's editions of the Coupe de France and the Coupe de la Ligue.

== Competitions ==
=== Overall record ===
Competition	First match	Last match	Starting round	Final position	Record							
Competition	First match	Last match	Starting round	Final position	Pld	W	D	L	GF	GA	GD	Win %
Ligue 2	6 August 2004	27 May 2005	Matchday 1	4th	38	14	15	9	56	35	+21	36.84
Coupe de France	November 2004		Seventh round	Seventh round	1	0	1	0	0	0	+0	0.00
Coupe de la Ligue	8 October 2004	21 December 2004	First round	Round of 16	3	2	0	1	3	5	−2	66.67
Total					42	16	16	10	59	40	+19	38.10

Source: Competitions

=== Ligue 2 ===
==== League table ====
Pos	Team	Pld	W	D	L	GF	GA	GD	Pts	Promotion or Relegation
2	Le Mans (P)	38	20	8	10	51	30	+21	68	Promotion to Ligue 1
3	Troyes (P)	38	20	8	10	61	48	+13	68	Promotion to Ligue 1
4	Dijon	38	14	15	9	44	34	+10	57	
5	Châteauroux	38	14	15	9	51	43	+8	57	
6	Sedan	38	16	9	13	38	38	0	57	

Source: Ligue 2
(P) Promoted

==== Results summary ====
Overall								Home						Away					
Pld	W	D	L	GF	GA	GD	Pts	W	D	L	GF	GA	GD	W	D	L	GF	GA	GD
38	18	12	8	56	35	+21	66	12	5	2	31	15	+16	6	7	6	25	20	+5

Source: Ligue 2

==== Results by round ====
Round	1	2	3	4	5	6	7	8	9	10	11	12	13	14	15	16	17	18	19	20	21	22	23	24	25	26	27	28	29	30	31	32	33	34	35	36	37	38
Ground	A	A	H	A	H	A	H	A	H	A	H	A	H	A	H	A	H	A	H	H	A	H	A	H	A	H	A	H	A	H	A	H	A	H	A	H	A	H
Result	L	D	W	W	L	W	W	L	D	D	D	L	D	L	W	D	W	L	W	D	D	D	L	D	D	W	D	W	W	L	W	D	W	D	W	W	L	D
Position	17	13	9	4	10	5	3	6	7	7	7	8	9	12	12	12	7	11	6	9	11	9	13	13	12	11	11	11	6	8	7	7	6	6	6	4	5	4

Source: Ligue 2
A = Away; H = Home; W = Win; D = Draw; L = Loss

==== Matches ====
6 August 2004 1	Laval	2–1	Dijon	Laval
--:-- CEST (UTC+2)

13 August 2004 2	Troyes	2–2	Dijon	Troyes
--:-- CEST (UTC+2)

17 August 2004 3	Dijon	1–0	Angers	Dijon
--:-- CEST (UTC+2)

20 August 2004 4	Lorient	0–2	Dijon	Lorient
--:-- CEST (UTC+2)

27 August 2004 5	Dijon	0–1	Nancy	Dijon
--:-- CEST (UTC+2)

3 September 2004 6	Guingamp	0–1	Dijon	Guingamp
--:-- CEST (UTC+2)

11 September 2004 7	Dijon	2–1	Niort	Dijon
--:-- CEST (UTC+2)

17 September 2004 8	Amiens	2–1	Dijon	Amiens
--:-- CEST (UTC+2)

21 September 2004 9	Dijon	2–2	Clermont	Dijon
--:-- CEST (UTC+2)

26 September 2004 10	Créteil	1–1	Dijon	Créteil
--:-- CEST (UTC+2)

4 October 2004 11	Dijon	0–0	Reims	Dijon
--:-- CEST (UTC+2)

15 October 2004 12	Le Mans	2–1	Dijon	Le Mans
--:-- CEST (UTC+2)

22 October 2004 13	Dijon	0–0	Gueugnon	Dijon
--:-- CEST (UTC+2)

29 October 2004 14	Le Havre	1–0	Dijon	Le Havre
--:-- CEST (UTC+2)

1 April 2005 31	Gueugnon	0–1	Dijon	Gueugnon
--:-- CEST (UTC+2)

8 April 2005 32	Dijon	0–0	Le Havre	Dijon
--:-- CEST (UTC+2)

15 April 2005 33	Grenoble	1–3	Dijon	Grenoble
--:-- CEST (UTC+2)

22 April 2005 34	Dijon	2–2	Brest	Dijon
--:-- CEST (UTC+2)

6 May 2005 35	Sedan	0–1	Dijon	Sedan
--:-- CEST (UTC+2)

13 May 2005 36	Dijon	3–0	Châteauroux	Dijon
--:-- CEST (UTC+2)

20 May 2005 37	Montpellier	4–2	Dijon	Montpellier
--:-- CEST (UTC+2)

27 May 2005 38	Dijon	0–0	Laval	Dijon
--:-- CEST (UTC+2)

=== Coupe de France ===
November 2004 Seventh round	Dijon	0–0 (a.e.t.) (3–4 p)	Louhans Cuiseaux FC	Dijon
--:-- CEST (UTC+2)				Stadium: Stade Gaston Gérard

=== Coupe de la Ligue ===
8 October 2004 First round	Dijon	1–0	Niort	Dijon
--:-- CEST (UTC+2)				Stadium: Stade Gaston Gérard

9 November 2004 Round of 32	Dijon	2–1 (a.e.t.)	Bordeaux	Dijon
--:-- CEST (UTC+2)				Stadium: Stade Gaston Gérard

21 December 2004 Round of 16	Clermont	4–0	Dijon	Clermont-Ferrand
--:-- CEST (UTC+2)				Stadium: Stade Gabriel-Montpied
