= Biagui Kamissoko =

French footballer (born 1983)

Personal information
- Date of birth: February 9, 1983 (age 43)
- Place of birth: Paris, France
- Height: 1.83 m (6 ft 0 in)
- Position: Midfielder

Senior career*
| Years | Team | Apps | (Gls) |
| 2001–2003 | Saint-Leu VO 95 | | |
| 2003–2008 | Grenoble | 137 | (4) |
| 2009 | Stade Reims | 11 | (0) |
| 2009–2011 | Vannes | 33 | (3) |
| 2012–2013 | Fréjus Saint-Raphaël | 29 | (2) |
| 2013–2015 | Grenoble | 20 | (1) |
- * Club domestic league appearances and goals

Biagui Kamissoko (born February 9, 1983) is a retired French professional footballer.
