= Moïse Kandé =

Association football player (born 1978)

Personal information
- Date of birth: 1 August 1978 (age 48)
- Place of birth: Dakar, Senegal
- Height: 1.90 m (6 ft 3 in)
- Position: Centre-back

Senior career*
Years	Team	Apps	(Gls)
1997–1998	FC Les Lilas	0	(0)
1998–2000	Clermont	2	(0)
2000–2001	FC Les Lilas	31	(1)
2001–2002	Olympique Noisy-le-Sec	34	(0)
2002–2006	Nîmes	99	(3)
2006–2007	Orléans	22	(2)
2007–2008	AEL Limassol	15	(0)
2008–2012	PAEEK FC	100	(1)
Total		303	(7)

International career
2003–2008	Mauritania	13	(0)
- * Club domestic league appearances and goals

Moïse Kandé (born 1 August 1978) is a former professional footballer who played as a centre-back. Born in Senegal, he was a member, as a naturalized citizen, of the Mauritania national team.
