= David de Freitas (French footballer) =

French footballer (born 1979)

Personal information
- Date of birth: 30 September 1979 (age 47)
- Place of birth: Senlis, France
- Height: 1.80 m (5 ft 11 in)
- Position: Midfielder

Senior career*
Years	Team	Apps	(Gls)
1997–2003	Beauvais	177	(9)
2003–2005	Grenoble	74	(6)
2005–2007	Amiens	73	(3)
2007–2010	Nantes	77	(7)
2010–2012	Angers	59	(5)
2012–2014	Châteauroux	59	(1)
2015–2016	UMS Montélimar	?	(?)
Total		519	(30)

Managerial career
- 2017: UMS Montélimar
- * Club domestic league appearances and goals

David de Freitas (born 30 September 1979) is a French former professional footballer who played as a midfielder. He was most recently the head coach of UMS Montélimar.

He is of Portuguese descent.

== Honours ==
Beauvais

- Championnat National: 2000
