= 2024–25 Dijon FCO season =

Dijon FCO
2024–25 season
- Manager: Baptiste Ridira
- Stadium: Stade Gaston Gérard
- Championnat National: 5th
- Coupe de France: Round of 64
- Biggest defeat: Valenciennes 2–0 Dijon

The 2024-25 season is the 27th in the history of Dijon FCO and the fourth consecutive season in the Championnat National, the French third division. In addition to the domestic league, Dijon is competing in the Coupe de France.

== Transfers ==
=== In ===
Pos.	Player	Transferred from	Fee	Date	Source
DF	(Morocco) Nassim Titebah	Unattached	Free	23 August 2024	
MF	(France) Adel Lembezat	(France) Pau FC B	Free	27 August 2024	
FW	(France) Jovany Ikanga	(France) Red Star	Loan	8 September 2024	

== Pre-season and friendlies ==
12 July 2024 Friendly	Dijon	3–0	GOAL FC	Saint-Apollinaire
		Report		Stadium: DFCO Park

26 July 2024 Friendly	Sochaux	2–3	Dijon	Saint-Vit

31 July 2024 Friendly	Dijon	5–1	Lyon Duchère

3 August 2024 Friendly	Dijon	1–1	Annecy	Hauteville

9 August 2024 Friendly	Dijon	2–0	Bourg-Péronnas

== Competitions ==
=== Overall record ===
Competition	First match	Last match	Starting round	Final position	Record							
Competition	First match	Last match	Starting round	Final position	Pld	W	D	L	GF	GA	GD	Win %
Championnat National	16 August 2024	16 May 2025	Matchday 1		14	6	4	4	11	8	+3	42.86
Coupe de France	16 November 2024	20 December 2024	Seventh round	Round of 64	3	2	1	0	7	3	+4	66.67
Total					17	8	5	4	18	11	+7	47.06

Last updated: 20 December 2024
Source: Competitions

=== Championnat National ===
==== League table ====
Pos	Team	Pld	W	D	L	GF	GA	GD	Pts	Promotion or relegation
2	Le Mans (P)	32	17	7	8	48	34	+14	58	Promotion to Ligue 2
3	Boulogne	32	15	11	6	46	34	+12	56	Qualification to promotion play-offs
4	Dijon	32	12	11	9	37	35	+2	47	
5	Bourg-Péronnas	32	12	10	10	26	28	−2	46	
6	Aubagne	32	13	6	13	43	37	+6	45	

Source: soccerway
Rules for classification: 1) head-to-head results; 2) head-to-head goal difference; 3) goal difference; 4) goals scored; 5) fair play points
(P) Promoted

==== Results summary ====
Overall								Home						Away					
Pld	W	D	L	GF	GA	GD	Pts	W	D	L	GF	GA	GD	W	D	L	GF	GA	GD
14	6	4	4	11	8	+3	22	4	2	1	6	1	+5	2	2	3	5	7	−2

Last updated: August 2024.

==== Results by round ====
Round	1	2	3	4	5	6	7	8	9	10	11	12	13	14	15
Ground	H	A		A	H	A	H	A	H	A	H	A	H	A	H
Result	L	L	B	D	W	W	W	D	D	L	W	W	W	L	D
Position															

Updated to match(es) played on August 2024. Source:
A = Away; H = Home; W = Win; D = Draw; L = Loss

==== Matches ====
16 August 2024 1	Dijon	0–1	Bourg-Péronnas

23 August 2024 2	Quevilly-Rouen	2–1	Dijon

3	Bye

6 September 2024 4	Le Mans	0–0	Dijon

13 September 2024 5	Dijon	2–0	Paris 13 Atletico

20 September 2024 6	Nancy	0–1	Dijon

27 September 2024 7	Dijon	1–0	Aubagne

4 October 2024 8	Orléans	1–1	Dijon

18 October 2024 9	Dijon	0–0	Nîmes

23 October 2024 10	Valenciennes	2–0	Dijon

1 November 2024 11	Dijon	1–0	Rouen

8 November 2024 12	Concarneau	1–2	Dijon

22 November 2024 13	Dijon	2–0	Versailles

6 December 2024 14	Villefranche	1–0	Dijon

13 December 2024 15	Dijon	0–0	Sochaux

=== Coupe de France ===
16 November 2024 Seventh round	FC Grandvillars	2–4	Dijon	Grandvillars
17:00				Stadium: Stade Léon Gelot

29 November 2024 Eighth round	Chambéry SF	0–2	Dijon	Chambéry
20:00				Stadium: Stade Municipal de Chambéry

20 December 2024 Round of 64	Espaly	1–1 (4–3 p)	Dijon	Espaly-Saint-Marcel
20:45				Stadium: Stade du Viouzou 2
