= Gaël Danic =

French footballer (born 1981)

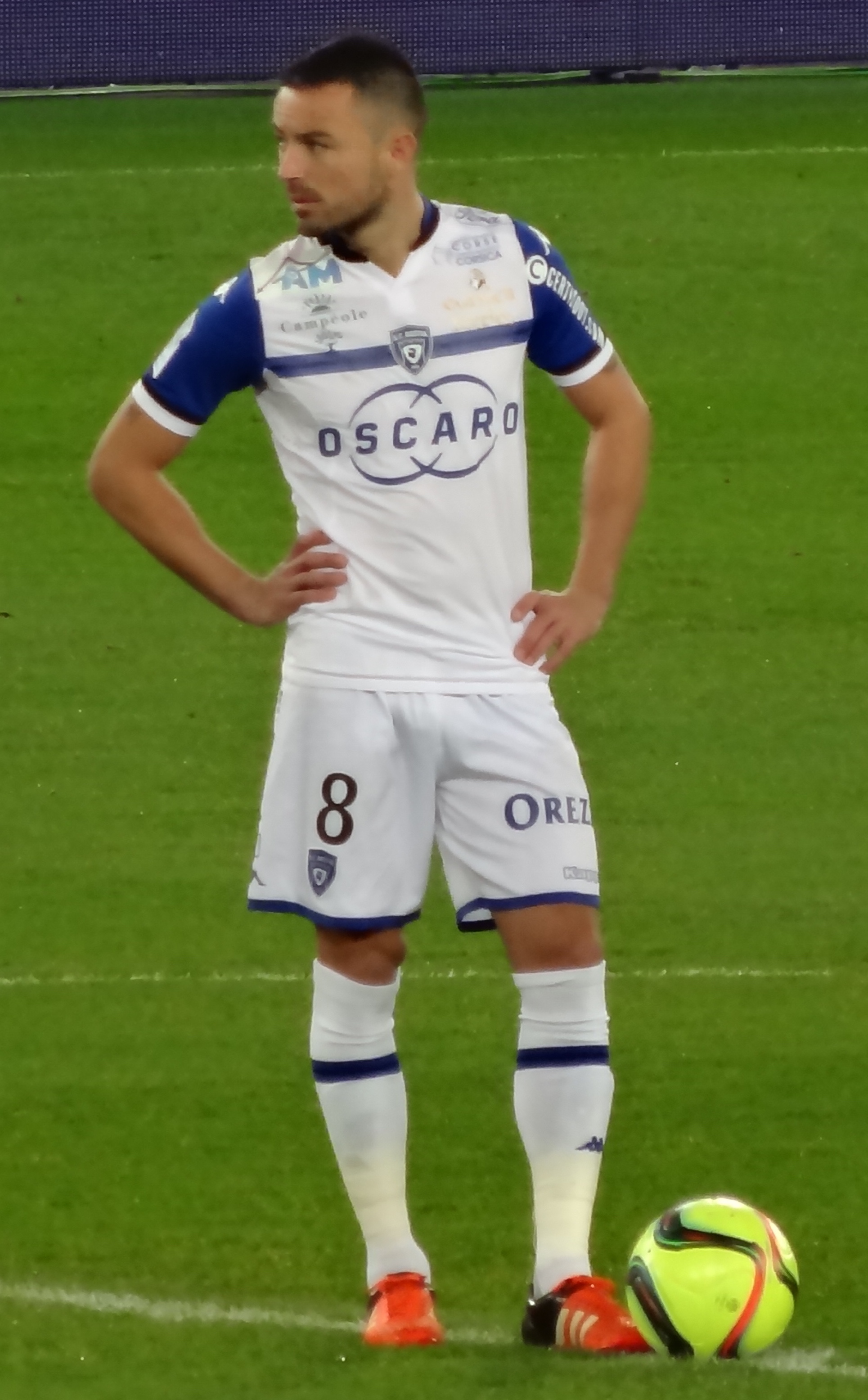
- Danic with Bastia

Personal information
- Date of birth: 19 November 1981 (age 44)
- Place of birth: Vannes, France
- Height: 1.76 m (5 ft 9 in)
- Position: Midfielder

Youth career
- Rennes

Senior career*
Years	Team	Apps	(Gls)
2000–2003	Rennes	22	(0)
2002–2003	→ Guingamp (loan)	18	(0)
2003–2005	Grenoble	69	(14)
2005–2008	Troyes	81	(10)
2006	→ Lorient (loan)	14	(1)
2008–2013	Valenciennes	166	(27)
2013–2015	Lyon	11	(0)
2014	Lyon B	5	(2)
2015–2017	Bastia	81	(10)
2017–2018	Lorient	23	(3)
2018–2019	Laval	32	(7)
2019–2021	Saint-Malo	15	(3)
Total		537	(77)

International career
2001	France U20	5	(0)
- * Club domestic league appearances and goals

Gaël Danic (born 19 November 1981) is a French former professional footballer who played as a midfielder.

== Club career ==
Danic played for Rennes at senior Level, before moving to Guingamp, and after that Grenoble, where he spent two years. He spent three years at Troyes although one of them he was loaned out to Lorient. He spent five years at Valenciennes where he played 101 games getting 15 goals.

On 1 July 2013, Lyon announced Danic had signed on a two-year contract and for a transfer fee of €800,000 transfer plus a possible €200,000 in bonuses.

In January 2015, after being released from his contract in Lyon, Danic signed an eighteen-month contract with Bastia.

== International career ==
Danic played five matches for the France U20s in the 2001 FIFA World Youth Championship.
