= Eric Asomani =

Belgian footballer

Personal information
- Full name: Eric Asomani
- Date of birth: 8 September 1999 (age 27)
- Place of birth: Namur, Belgium
- Position: Forward

Team information
- Current team: Saned Joniškis
- Number: 16

Youth career
- Waasland-Beveren

Senior career*
Years	Team	Apps	(Gls)
2019–2020	Waasland-Beveren	1	(0)
2024–	Saned Joniškis	1	(0)
- * Club domestic league appearances and goals as of 19:57, 26 May 2024 (UTC)

Eric Asomani (born 8 September 1999) is a Belgian footballer who plays for Saned Joniškis in Lithuania.

== Personal life ==
Born in Belgium, Asomani is of Ghanaian descent.
