= William Massot =

French footballer (born 1977)

Personal information
- Full name: William Massot
- Date of birth: 1 September 1977 (age 49)
- Place of birth: Nîmes, France
- Height: 1.84 m (6 ft 1/2 in)
- Position: Defender

Team information
- Current team: Rodez AF

Senior career*
| Years | Team | Apps | (Gls) |
| 1995–1999 | Nîmes Olympique | 6 | (0) |
| 1999–2000 | Valenciennes | 18 | (0) |
| 2000–2002 | Clermont Foot | 22 | (2) |
| 2002–2003 | FC Sète | 31 | (1) |
| 2003–2006 | Stade Brestois | 64 | (7) |
| 2006–2008 | FC Sète | 46 | (5) |
| 2008–2009 | Nîmes Olympique | 12 | (0) |
| 2009–2011 | Rodez AF | 43 | (2) |
- * Club domestic league appearances and goals as of 04:59, 26 July 2015 (UTC)

William Massot (born 1 September 1977) is a French professional footballer. He last played in the Championnat National for Rodez AF.

Massot played at the professional level in Ligue 2 for Nîmes Olympique and Stade Brestois 29.
