= Matthieu Gianni =

French footballer (born 1985)

Personal information
- Date of birth: January 2, 1985 (age 41)
- Place of birth: Bastia, France
- Height: 1.82 m (5 ft 11 1/2 in)
- Position: Midfielder

Team information
- Current team: Sainte Lucie FC

Youth career
- 2003–2004: Grenoble

Senior career*
Years	Team	Apps	(Gls)
2004–2006	Grenoble	8	(0)
2006–2009	Grenoble B		
2009–2010	US Le Pontet	25	(2)
2010–	Sainte Lucie FC		
- * Club domestic league appearances and goals

Matthieu Gianni (born January 2, 1985) is a French professional football player, who currently plays for Sainte Lucie Football Club of Corsica.

== Career ==
Gianni played eight games in the Ligue 2 for Grenoble Foot 38 and twenty five in the Championnat de France amateur for US Le Pontet.

== International career ==
Gianni is member of the unofficial Corsica national football team.
