= 2004–05 Coupe de France =

Tournament details
- Country: France
- Teams: 6,263

Final positions
- Champions: Auxerre
- Runners-up: Sedan

Tournament statistics
- Top goal scorer(s): Javier Saviola (6 goals)

The Coupe de France 2004–05 was its 88th edition. It was won by AJ Auxerre.

The cup winner qualified for UEFA Cup.

== Round of 64 ==
Team 1	Score	Team 2
Lille (L1)	2–1	Le Mans (L2)
Sedan (L2)	3–1	Strasbourg (L1)
Nancy (L2)	1–1 (a.e.t.) (4–5 p)	Ajaccio (L1)
Châteauroux (L2)	2–3 (a.e.t.)	Grenoble (L2)
Rennes (L1)	1–0 (a.e.t.)	Brest (L2)
Viry-Châtillon (CFA)	0–2	Lyon (L1)
Vesoul (CFA)	1–1 (a.e.t.) (5–6 p)	Clermont (L2)
Schiltigheim (CFA)	0–2	Reims (L2)
Mulhouse (CFA2)	0–2	Caen (L1)
Tarbes (DH)	0–3	Vannes (CFA)
Beauvais (CFA)	0–4	Nice (L1)
Seyssinet (DH)	0–7	Monaco (L1)
Rhône Vallées (DH)	0–0 (a.e.t.) (3–1 p)	Menton (DH)
Marseille (L1)	2–3	Angers (L2)
Gambsheim (DH)	0–3	Toulouse (L1)
Épinal (CFA)	0–1 (a.e.t.)	Blois (CFA2)
Montagnarde (CFA2)	2–0	Pontivy (CFA)
Troyes (L2)	1–3	Albi (CFA)
Toulon (CFA)	3–0	Montceau (CFA2)
Boulogne (CFA)	1–0 (a.e.t.)	Avranches (CFA2)
Calais (CFA)	0–1	Auxerre (L1)
Quevilly (CFA)	1–0	Guingamp (L2)
Saint-Dizier (DH)	0–4	Lens (L1)
Rodez (CFA)	1–2	Metz (L1)
Cournon-d'Auvergne (DH)	0–3	Nantes (L1)
La Flèche (CFA2)	1–2	Libourne-Saint-Seurin (Nat.)
Bordeaux (L1)	2–0	Istres (L1)
Langueux (DSR)	1–6	Paris Saint-Germain (L1)
Saumur (DH)	2–2 (a.e.t.) (4–3 p)	Paris FC (CFA)
Sochaux (L1)	1–0	Bastia (L1)
Haguenau (DH)	1–2	Romorantin (Nat.)
Nîmes (Nat.)	3–2	Saint-Étienne (L1)

== Round of 32 ==
Team 1	Score	Team 2
Nice (L1)	3–1 (a.e.t.)	Reims (L2)
Rennes (L1)	2–0	Caen (L1)
Metz (L1)	0–1	Sochaux (L1)
Lille (L1)	3–2	Lens (L1)
Nîmes (Nat.)	1–1 (a.e.t.) (4–2 p)	Ajaccio (L1)
Libourne-Saint-Seurin (Nat.)	2–4	Monaco (L1)
Vannes (CFA)	0–2	Auxerre (L1)
Saumur (DH)	0–2	Nantes (L1)
Albi (CFA)	2–0 (a.e.t.)	Angers (L2)
Romorantin (Nat.)	0–1	Quevilly (CFA)
Clermont (L2)	1–0	Toulon (CFA)
Sedan (L2)	4–0	Montagnarde (CFA2)
Rhône Vallées (DH)	1–2	Grenoble (L2)
Boulogne (CFA)	4–0	Blois (CFA2)
Toulouse (L1)	1–2	Lyon (L1)
Paris Saint-Germain (L1)	3–1 (a.e.t.)	Bordeaux (L1)

== Round of 16 ==
Team 1	Score	Team 2
Clermont (L2)	1–1 (a.e.t.) (4–3 p)	Lyon (L1)
Sedan (L2)	2–0	Quevilly (CFA)
Nîmes (Nat.)	4–0	Nice (L1)
Rennes (L1)	0–1 (a.e.t.)	Monaco (L1)
Lille (L1)	1–3 (a.e.t.)	Grenoble (L2)
Albi (CFA)	0–3	Sochaux (L1)
Auxerre (L1)	3–2	Paris Saint-Germain (L1)
Boulogne (CFA)	1–0	Nantes (L1)

== Quarter-finals ==
19 April 2005	Sedan (2)	2–1 (a.e.t.)	Grenoble (2)	Sedan
	Noro 24'; Citony 118'		Rojas 75'	Stadium: Stade Émile Albeau; Attendance: 8,769; Referee: Bruno Coué

19 April 2005	Monaco (1)	1–0 (a.e.t.)	Clermont (2)	Monaco
	Camara 105'			Stadium: Stade Louis II; Attendance: 7,055; Referee: Laurent Duhamel

20 April 2005	Nîmes (3)	4–3 (a.e.t.)	Sochaux (1)	Nîmes
	Chavas 23'; Enza-Yamissi 72'; Kandé 77'; Verschave 105'		Kader 27', 39'; Ilan 57'	Stadium: Stade des Costières; Attendance: 17,516; Referee: Éric Poulat

20 April 2005	Boulogne (4)	1–2 (a.e.t.)	Auxerre (1)	Lens
	Ehouman 61'		Grichting 90'; Pieroni 98'	Stadium: Stade Felix-Bollaert; Attendance: 26,540; Referee: Alain Sars

== Semi-finals ==
10 May 2005	Auxerre (1)	2–1	Nîmes (3)	Auxerre
	Kalou 46' (pen.); Tainio 78'		Verschave 90+3'	Stadium: Stade de l'Abbé-Deschamps; Attendance: 15,000; Referee: Claude Colombo

11 May 2005	Monaco (1)	0–1	Sedan (2)	Monaco
			Citony 75'	Stadium: Stade Louis II; Attendance: 7,000; Referee: Bertrand Layec

== Final ==
4 June 2005
20:45

Sedan	1–2	Auxerre
Noro 63'		Benjani 37'; Kalou 90'

Stade de France, Saint-Denis
Attendance: 78,357
Referee: Bruno Derrien

== Topscorer ==
Javier Saviola (6 goals)
