= Ludovic Liron =

French footballer (born 1978)

Personal information
- Date of birth: 30 January 1978 (age 48)
- Place of birth: Béziers, France
- Height: 1.83 m (6 ft 0 in)
- Position: Defender

Senior career*
Years	Team	Apps	(Gls)
2001–2003	Stade Reims	64	(2)
2003–2005	Troyes AC	70	(2)
2005–2007	Valenciennes FC	41	(0)
2007–2008	Stade de Reims	9	(1)
2009–2010	Nîmes		
2010	Arles-Avignon		

International career
?	France	?	(?)
- * Club domestic league appearances and goals as of October 20, 2007

Ludovic Liron (born 30 January 1978) is a French football defender who played for clubs in French Ligue 1 and Ligue 2.

== Career ==
Liron helped three clubs win promotion to Ligue 1, and was a key member of the Valenciennes FC that won 2005–06 Ligue 2.
