= Ghislain Gimbert =

French footballer (born 1985)

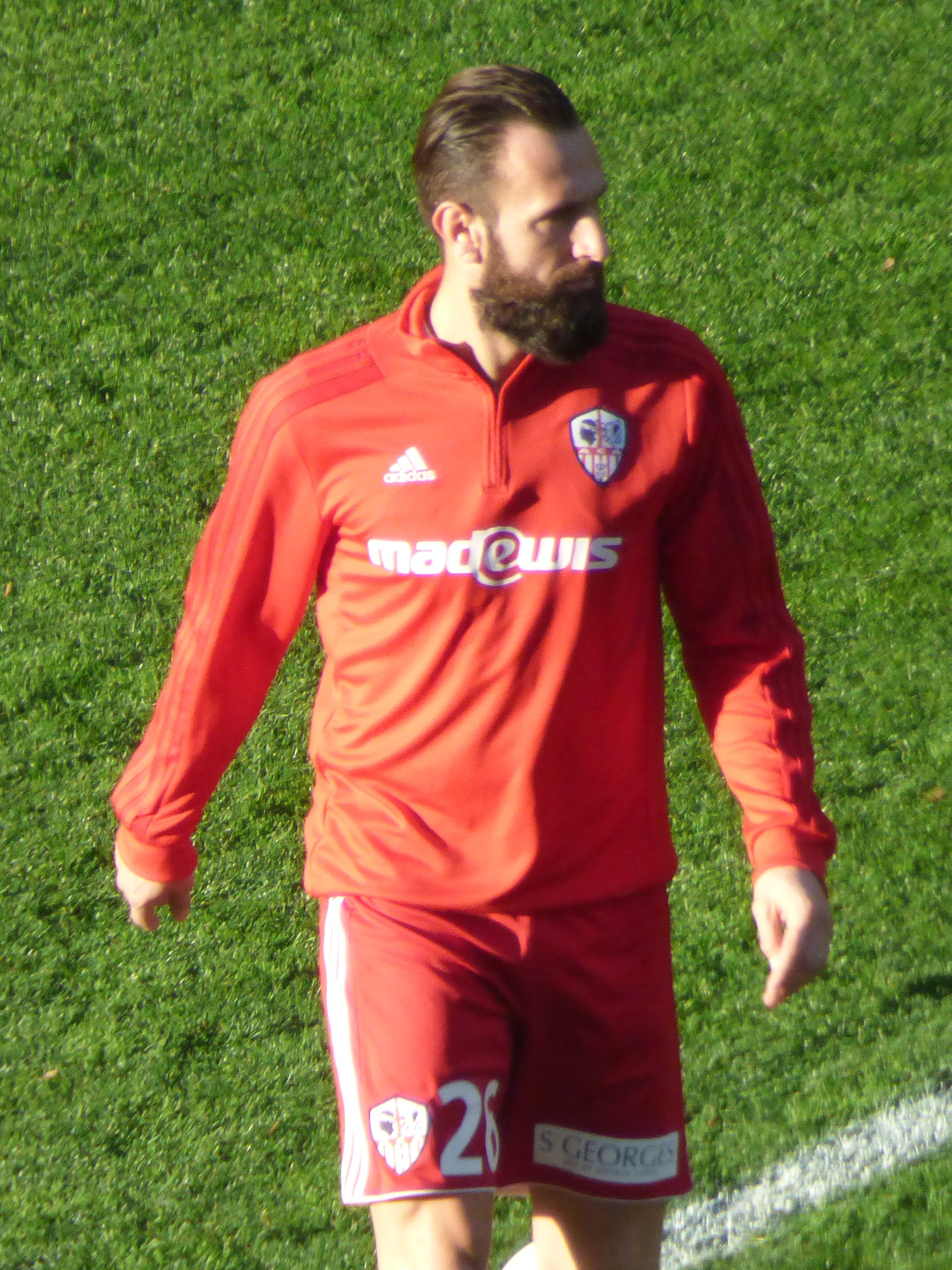
- Gimbert in 2018

Personal information
- Date of birth: 7 August 1985 (age 41)
- Place of birth: Roanne, France
- Height: 1.81 m (5 ft 11 in)
- Position: Striker

Team information
- Current team: FC Métropole Troyenne

Youth career
- –2002: Roanne
- 2002–2004: Grenoble

Senior career*
Years	Team	Apps	(Gls)
2004–2007	Grenoble	24	(4)
2006–2007	→ Tours (loan)	28	(8)
2007–2008	Libourne-Saint-Seurin	34	(5)
2008–2010	Vannes	62	(14)
2010–2013	Laval	101	(19)
2013–2014	Troyes	50	(18)
2015	Zulte Waregem	12	(3)
2015–2017	Le Havre	64	(16)
2017–2019	Ajaccio	70	(19)
2019–2020	Ümraniyespor	31	(10)
2020–2021	Le Mans	17	(3)
2021–	FC Métropole Troyenne		
- * Club domestic league appearances and goals as of 15 May 2021

Ghislain Gimbert (born 7 August 1985) is a French professional footballer who plays as a striker for amateur side FC Métropole Troyenne. In a career spanning 21 seasons to date, Gimbert has made more than 400 appearances, and scored 97 goals, in Ligue 2, with Grenoble, Tours, Libourne-Saint-Seurin, Vannes, Laval, Troyes, Le Havre and AC Ajaccio. He has played in Turkey and Belgium.

== Honours ==
Vannes

- Coupe de la Ligue runner-up: 2008–09

Troyes

- Ligue 2: 2014–15
