= 2004–05 Ligue 2 =

66th season of the second-tier football league in France

Ligue 2
- Season: 2004–05

The Ligue 2 season 2004/2005, organised by the LFP was won by AS Nancy and saw the promotions of AS Nancy, Le Mans UC72 and Troyes AC, whereas Angers SCO and SC Bastia were relegated to National.

== 20 participating teams ==
- Amiens
- Angers
- Brest
- Châteauroux
- Clermont
- Créteil
- Dijon
- Grenoble
- Gueugnon
- Guingamp
- Laval
- Le Havre
- Le Mans
- Lorient
- Montpellier
- Nancy
- Niort
- Reims
- Sedan
- Troyes

== League table ==
Pos	Team	Pld	W	D	L	GF	GA	GD	Pts	Promotion or Relegation
1	Nancy (C, P)	38	21	8	9	54	33	+21	71	Promotion to Ligue 1
2	Le Mans (P)	38	20	8	10	51	30	+21	68	Promotion to Ligue 1
3	Troyes (P)	38	20	8	10	61	48	+13	68	Promotion to Ligue 1
4	Dijon	38	14	15	9	44	34	+10	57	
5	Châteauroux	38	14	15	9	51	43	+8	57	
6	Sedan	38	16	9	13	38	38	0	57	
7	Guingamp	38	15	11	12	53	43	+10	56	
8	Montpellier	38	15	10	13	44	39	+5	55	
9	Brest	38	13	16	9	38	34	+4	55	
10	Lorient	38	14	8	16	47	51	−4	50	
11	Grenoble	38	12	12	14	45	50	−5	48	
12	Gueugnon	38	12	12	14	30	40	−10	48	
13	Amiens	38	11	14	13	41	41	0	47	
14	Laval	38	13	8	17	43	51	−8	47	
15	Créteil	38	11	13	14	42	38	+4	46	
16	Reims	38	10	13	15	34	55	−21	43	
17	Le Havre	38	11	9	18	28	42	−14	42	
18	Clermont	38	8	15	15	34	39	−5	39	
19	Niort (R)	38	10	8	20	40	52	−12	38	Relegation to Championnat National [fr]
20	Angers (R)	38	8	14	16	32	44	−12	38	Relegation to Championnat National [fr]

Source: Ligue 2
(C) Champions; (P) Promoted; (R) Relegated

== Results ==
Home \ Away	AMI	ANG	BRS	CHA	CLE	CRE	DIJ	GRE	GUE	GUI	LAV	LHA	MFC	LOR	MHS	NAL	NRT	REI	SED	TRO
Amiens		0–2	1–0	2–2	1–1	0–0	2–1	0–2	4–0	1–1	2–1	1–2	0–0	0–0	2–0	0–3	4–1	1–1	1–2	3–2
Angers	3–2		1–0	1–2	1–1	1–1	2–2	0–0	1–1	1–0	0–1	0–2	0–2	2–0	0–1	1–1	1–2	3–0	2–2	2–1
Brest	1–1	1–0		0–0	1–2	1–0	1–1	1–1	0–0	2–2	2–1	1–0	1–0	0–0	1–1	3–2	1–0	4–2	2–0	1–1
Châteauroux	1–0	1–1	1–2		1–1	2–2	2–1	1–1	0–0	2–0	1–0	4–1	1–3	3–0	2–0	0–0	2–0	1–1	0–0	3–1
Clermont	0–0	0–0	0–0	2–0		0–1	0–0	5–0	0–2	2–1	3–1	0–1	0–0	2–0	0–0	0–0	2–0	0–0	0–1	1–3
Créteil	1–0	2–0	2–3	3–1	1–1		1–1	0–0	3–0	1–1	3–1	0–2	1–0	2–0	3–3	2–1	0–1	4–0	2–0	0–1
Dijon	2–1	1–0	2–2	3–0	2–2	1–0		2–1	0–0	1–1	0–0	0–0	0–2	0–0	1–0	0–1	2–1	0–0	1–0	1–1
Grenoble	1–1	0–0	0–2	2–0	1–0	1–1	1–3		2–1	4–2	2–1	2–1	2–1	1–2	0–0	1–1	5–1	2–0	0–0	1–2
Gueugnon	1–1	1–0	1–0	1–3	2–0	1–0	0–1	1–0		0–0	1–1	1–0	0–0	2–1	2–1	0–2	2–1	1–1	0–0	1–2
Guingamp	2–1	1–0	1–2	2–0	3–1	2–0	0–1	3–1	2–0		2–1	1–0	2–1	1–1	3–1	3–2	3–1	2–0	4–0	0–1
Laval	1–0	1–1	2–1	2–3	4–3	0–0	2–1	3–1	1–0	1–0		0–1	1–2	0–0	1–3	1–2	1–0	1–2	2–2	2–1
Le Havre	1–0	0–0	0–0	0–1	0–0	1–1	1–0	2–1	0–1	2–2	1–1		0–1	3–1	0–1	0–0	1–2	3–1	0–0	1–0
Le Mans	1–1	3–0	1–1	0–2	2–2	1–0	2–1	1–0	1–2	0–0	3–0	1–0		3–1	2–0	1–2	1–0	0–0	3–0	2–3
Lorient	1–2	1–2	3–0	2–1	1–0	3–1	0–2	2–0	3–2	1–1	1–1	2–0	1–2		1–2	1–1	3–1	3–1	2–1	1–2
Montpellier	0–2	2–1	1–0	0–0	1–0	0–0	4–2	3–1	1–1	1–1	3–1	3–0	2–0	0–1		1–1	2–0	0–0	0–1	3–4
Nancy	1–2	3–1	1–0	1–1	2–1	1–0	2–0	2–0	1–0	2–1	0–1	1–0	1–3	1–0	1–0		3–1	3–1	1–2	1–0
Niort	3–1	0–0	1–1	0–0	0–2	2–2	0–0	1–3	1–1	1–0	2–0	6–1	0–3	4–0	0–1	1–2		0–1	3–0	0–1
Reims	0–0	1–1	0–0	1–1	3–0	2–1	0–5	1–1	2–1	3–2	2–0	3–0	0–1	1–4	0–2	0–4	2–0		0–0	2–0
Sedan	0–1	1–0	0–0	2–1	2–0	1–0	0–1	1–2	3–0	3–0	0–3	1–0	1–2	3–2	2–0	2–0	0–0	2–0		2–1
Troyes	0–0	4–1	2–0	5–5	1–0	2–1	2–2	2–2	1–0	1–1	0–2	2–1	2–0	1–2	2–1	2–1	1–1	2–0	2–1	

Source: Ligue 2
Legend: Blue = home team win; Yellow = draw; Red = away team win.

== Top goalscorers ==
Rank	Player	Club	Goals
1	(Ivory Coast) Bakari Koné	Lorient	24
2	(France) Sébastien Grax	Troyes	16
3	(Ivory Coast) Élie Kroupi	Nancy	14
4	(Burkina Faso) Moumouni Dagano	Guingamp	13
4	(France) Cédric Fauré	Guingamp	13
4	(France) James Fanchone	Le Mans	13
4	(France) Benjamin Nivet	Troyes	13
8	(Togo) Robert Malm	Brest	12
8	(Portugal) Rui Pataca	Créteil	12
10	(France) Laurent Dufresne	Nancy	11

== Attendances ==
#	Club	Average
1	Nancy	12,081
2	Guingamp	10,568
3	Sedan	9,717
4	ESTAC	8,762
5	Lorient	8,248
6	Le Mans	7,490
7	Le Havre	7,389
8	Brest	7,340
9	Amiens	7,125
10	La Berrichonne	6,669
11	MHSC	6,645
12	Reims	5,800
13	Grenoble	5,063
14	Clermont	5,045
15	Dijon	4,799
16	Laval	4,710
17	Angers	4,693
18	Chamois niortais	4,447
19	Gueugnon	3,742
20	Créteil	1,862
