= Nasser Menassel =

French footballer (born 1983)

Personal information
- Full name: Nasser Menassel
- Date of birth: January 6, 1983 (age 43)
- Place of birth: La Tronche, France
- Height: 1.77 m (5 ft 10 in)
- Position: Midfielder

Senior career*
Years	Team	Apps	(Gls)
2003–2007	Grenoble	31	(1)
2007–2008	Rodez	28	(2)
2008–2009	Otopeni	19	(0)
2009–2010	Internaţional	24	(0)
2010	Pandurii Târgu Jiu	9	(0)
2011–2012	Universitatea Cluj	27	(1)
2012	FC Brașov	6	(0)
2013	Damila Măciuca	8	(1)
2014	Enosis Neon Parekklisias	8	(2)
2015	FC Échirolles	1	(0)
- * Club domestic league appearances and goals as of 29 February 2016

Nasser Menassel (born January 6, 1983, La Tronche, France) is a former footballer.

He holds both French and Algerian nationalities.
