= Gérard Lifondja =

Belgian-Congolese footballer

Personal information
- Full name: Gérard Lifondja
- Date of birth: 2 March 1989 (age 37)
- Place of birth: Etterbeek, Belgium
- Height: 1.83 m (6 ft 0 in)
- Position: Midfielder

Youth career
- 1998–2002: RRC Etterbeek
- 2002–2004: RWD Molenbeek
- 2005–2007: RSC Anderlecht

Senior career*
Years	Team	Apps	(Gls)
2007–2010	RKC Waalwijk	19	(0)
2010–2011	Digenis Akritas Morphou	16	(3)
2011–2012	KRC Mechelen	19	(2)
2012–2015	Olympia Wijgmaal		
2015–2016	FC Pepingen		
2016-2017	SK Berlare		
Total		54	(5)

International career
2008	Congo DR U-23		
- * Club domestic league appearances and goals

Gérard Lifondja (born 2 March 1989) is a Belgian-Congolese former footballer.

== Career ==
Lifondja began his career in the youth side for Royal Racing Club Etterbeek. He signed than in summer 2002 with RWD Molenbeek, before in January 2005 joined to the youth Academy of RSC Anderlecht. After two years in the youth side with Anderlecht in July 2007 he was scouted by Dutch side RKC Waalwijk. He played during his three years 19 games in the Eredivisie for Waalwijk.

He joined in summer 2010 to Cyprus side Digenis Akritas Morphou. On 5 July 2011 announced his return to Belgium and signed for KRC Mechelen.

=== International ===
Lifondja was member of the U-23 Squad of the Democratic Republic of the Congo under-23 national football team during the Olympic Games 2008 Qualification.
