= Ousmane Traoré =

Burkinabé footballer

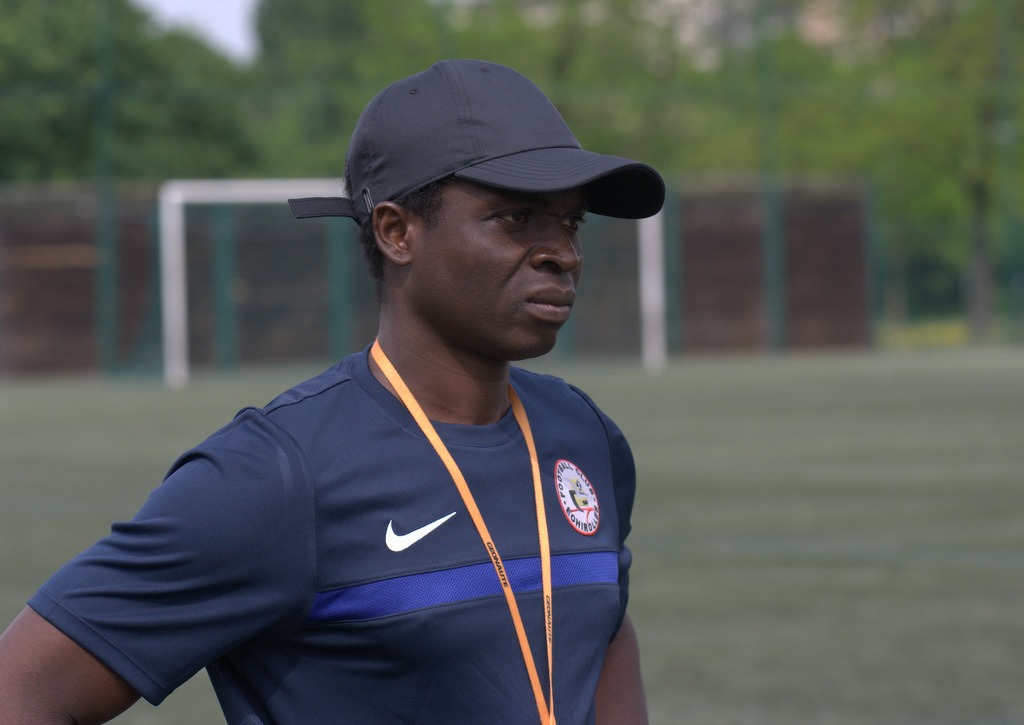
- Traoré in 2021

Personal information
- Date of birth: 6 March 1977 (age 49)
- Place of birth: Ouagadougou, Upper Volta
- Height: 1.80 m (5 ft 11 in)
- Position: Defender

Youth career
- 1995–1997: ASFA Yennega

Senior career*
Years	Team	Apps	(Gls)
1997–2001	ASFA Yennega	80	(5)
2001–2003	ASOA Valence		
2003–2004	Lorient	17	(1)
2004–2005	Grenoble	30	(1)
2005–2006	US Roye	17	(4)
2006–2007	Saint-Priest	10	(1)
2007–2008	Al-Watani	17	(0)
2009	SOC Savoie	4	(0)
2009	Cercle Bamako		
2009–2011	AS Valence	5	(0)
2011–2012	FC Échirolles		

International career
1998–2005	Burkina Faso	26	(1)
- * Club domestic league appearances and goals

Ousmane Traoré (born 6 March 1977 in Ouagadougou) is a Burkinabé former professional footballer who played as a defender.

== International career ==
Traoré was a member of the Burkina Faso national team at the 2004 African Nations Cup, which finished bottom of its group in the first round of competition, thus failing to secure qualification for the quarter-finals.
