= Jean-Michel Lesage =

French footballer (born 1977)

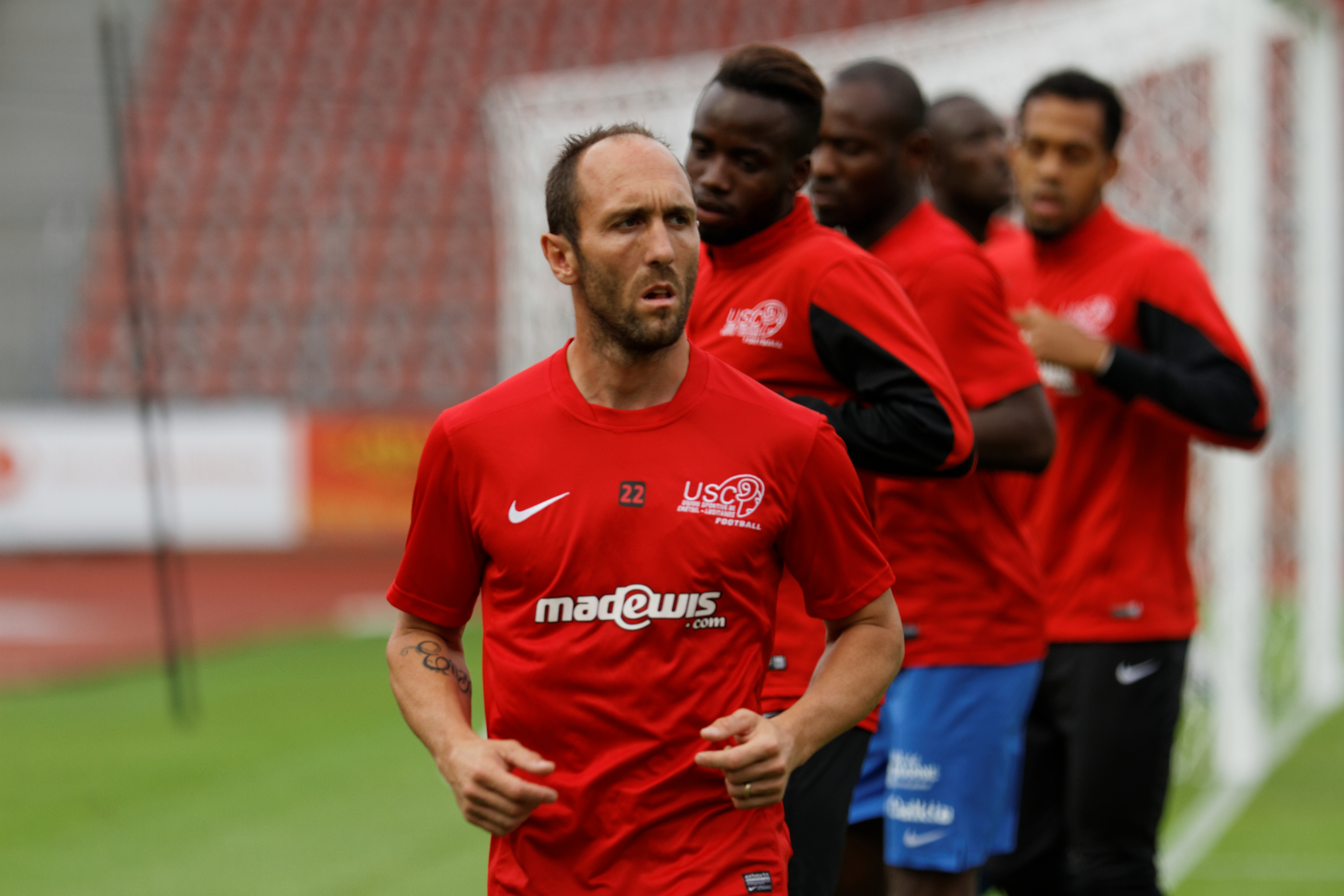
- Lesage with Créteil in 2014

Personal information
- Date of birth: 1 May 1977 (age 49)
- Place of birth: Bourg-la-Reine, France
- Height: 1.81 m (5 ft 11 in)
- Position: Attacking midfielder

Senior career*
Years	Team	Apps	(Gls)
1998–1999	Créteil		
1999–2007	Le Havre	260	(66)
2007–2008	Auxerre	11	(0)
2008–2010	Le Havre	60	(10)
2010–2016	Créteil	183	(46)
2017–2019	Poissy	20	(6)
Total		534	(128)
- * Club domestic league appearances and goals

Jean-Michel Lesage (born 1 May 1977) is a French former professional footballer who played as an attacking midfielder.

== Career ==
Lesage was born in Bourg-la-Reine. He played as a left winger at the start of his career, but then became an attacking midfielder. As an attacker, he was the joint-highest scorer (16 goals) in Ligue 2 in the 2006–07 season, along with Steve Savidan from Valenciennes.

On 5 April 2017, he announced his retirement. Lesage finished his career as the record all time goal scorer for both Le Havre and Créteil.

== Honours ==
- Ligue 2 Player of the Month: February 2007
