= Nassim Akrour =

Algerian footballer (born 1974)

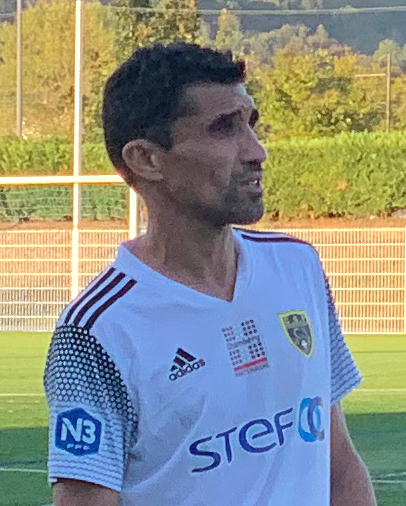
- Credit: Benoît Prieur - CC-BY-SA

Personal information
- Date of birth: 10 July 1974 (age 52)
- Place of birth: Courbevoie, France
- Height: 1.81 m (5 ft 11 1/2 in)
- Position: Striker

Team information
- Current team: Annecy (U16 coach)

Senior career*
Years	Team	Apps	(Gls)
1995–1997	Olympique Noisy-le-Sec		
1997–1999	Sutton United	41	(19)
1999–2000	Woking	38	(12)
2000–2002	FC Istres	74	(32)
2002–2004	Troyes	44	(10)
2004	Le Havre	16	(2)
2004–2010	Grenoble	194	(54)
2010–2013	FC Istres	101	(28)
2013–2016	Grenoble	85	(40)
2016–2019	Annecy	69	(38)
2020–2025	Chambéry	84	(16)
Total		746	(251)

International career
2001–2004	Algeria	18	(6)
- * Club domestic league appearances and goals

Nassim Akrour (Arabic: نسيم أكرور; born 10 July 1974) is an Algerian football coach and former professional player, who last played for Chambéry; he currently coaches the youth team at Annecy, whom he represented as a player between 2016 and 2019. Though born in France, he played for the Algeria national team, earning 18 caps and scoring six goals between 2001 and 2004.

Akrour is the all-time leading scorer of French club Grenoble Foot 38 with 94 league goals.

== Club career ==
He began his career with Olympique Noisy-le-Sec, moving to England in 1997 to join Sutton United, where he scored 19 goals in 41 appearances during the 1998-99 season as the club won promotion to the Football Conference. He left Sutton in 1999, joining new divisional rivals Woking; he was a fixture of the team throughout the 1999-2000 season, scoring twelve league goals as Woking finished in mid-table.

Akrour returned to his native France in the summer of 2000 to join FC Istres, where he scored sixteen goals in his first season as the team earned promotion to Division 2, and matched that tally in his second season. This good form prompted Troyes to sign Akrour in 2002, but he struggled to adapt to Ligue 1, managing only 13 appearances and one goal. He stayed with the club following their relegation, and again proved a regular scorer at Ligue 2 level, this time scoring 9 times in 31 games.

He moved to Grenoble in 2004, beginning a six-year association with the club; scoring at least ten goals a season for three consecutive seasons between 2005 and 2008, he reached his peak in his early thirties, helping the team to promotion to Ligue 1 in 2008, and survival the following year.

In July 2010, Akrour returned to FC Istres, signing a one-year contract with an option for a second year. He remained with Istres until the summer of 2013, when he rejoined Grenoble, who were now playing in the fourth tier of French football.

Akrour scored regularly for Grenoble in the fourth division, registering twelve in 25 appearances as they missed out on promotion by four points in 2013–14, then 16 in 29 appearances as they missed out by one point the following season, and 12 in 29 appearances as they missed out by three points in 2015-16.

Now aged 42, Akrour moved to Annecy in 2016; he initially announced his retirement from playing in July 2019 aged 45, in order to take up a role as a youth coach with the club, but reversed this decision six months later when he signed as a player for Chambéry.

He scored on his début for Chambéry in a friendly match, and followed this with good performances in the league, managing two goals in six appearances before the end of the 2019–20 season. Akrour remained with the club into his 48th year and the 2021–22 season, continuing to score with some regularity. During the 2023–24 season, he was limited to frequent appearances as a substitute and did not start a match throughout most of the season, but remained a force in front of goal; in April 2024, aged 49 years and 9 months, he scored Chambéry's only goal, and his fifth of the campaign, as they drew 1–1 with Feurs. The following week, he made his first start of the season, playing 67 minutes of a 0–0 draw with Espaly-Saint-Marcel.

Akrour announced his retirement for the second time in August 2025, aged 51.

== International career ==
On 5 December 2001 Akrour made his debut for the Algerian national team as a 60th-minute substitute in a 1–1 friendly with Ghana in Algiers.

Akrour was a member of the Algerian 2002 African Nations Cup team, who were eliminated in the first round after finishing last in their group. He played in all three of Algeria's games, starting in one, and scored one goal in the second group game against Liberia.

He was also part of the Algerian 2004 African Nations Cup team, who finished second in their group in the first round of competition before being defeated by Morocco in the quarter-finals.

== National team statistics ==
Algeria national team
Year	Apps	Goals
2001	2	0
2002	7	4
2003	5	2
2004	4	0
Total	18	6

=== International goals ===
#	Date	Venue	Opponent	Score	Result	Competition
1.	14 January 2002	Stade 5 Juillet 1962, Algiers, Algeria	Benin	3 – 0	4 – 0	Friendly match
2.	25 January 2002	Stade 26 mars, Bamako, Mali	Liberia	1 – 1	2 – 2	2002 African Cup of Nations
3.	11 October 2002	Stade 19 Mai 1956, Annaba, Algeria	Chad	1 – 0	4 – 1	2004 African Cup of Nations (qualification)
4.	11 October 2002	Stade 19 Mai 1956, Annaba, Algeria	Chad	4 – 1	4 – 1	2004 African Cup of Nations (qualification)
5.	29 March 2003	Estádio da Cidadela, Luanda, Angola	Angola	1 – 1	1 – 1	Friendly match
6.	14 November 2003	Stade 5 Juillet 1962, Algiers, Algeria	Niger	6 - 0	6 - 0	2006 FIFA World Cup qualification

== Personal life ==
Akrour was born in Courbevoie in the western suburbs of Paris. He holds both French and Algerian nationalities.
