= Rui Pataca =

Portuguese football manager and former player (born 1973)

Personal information
- Full name: Rui Carlos Jorge Pataca
- Date of birth: 8 May 1973 (age 53)
- Place of birth: Luanda, Angola
- Height: 1.80 m (5 ft 11 in)
- Position: Striker

Youth career
- 1983–1984: Montijo
- 1984–1986: FC Areias
- 1987–1991: Alcochetense

Senior career*
Years	Team	Apps	(Gls)
1991–1993	Alcochetense		
1993–1994	Comércio Indústria		
1994	Salir		
1995	Louletano		
1995–1996	Ovarense	31	(5)
1996–1998	Covilhã	30	(10)
1998–1999	Felgueiras	33	(18)
1999–2000	Belenenses	19	(6)
2000	→ Montpellier (loan)	11	(5)
2000–2004	Montpellier	67	(14)
2004–2009	Créteil	97	(22)
Total		258	(68)

Managerial career
- 2009–2011: Créteil (assistant)
- 2011–2012: Rodez
- * Club domestic league appearances and goals

Rui Carlos Jorge Pataca (born 8 May 1973) is a Portuguese retired football who played as a striker, and a manager.

== Playing career ==
Born in Luanda, Portuguese Angola, Pataca only started playing professional football at the age of 22, with A.D. Ovarense in the Portuguese second division, going on to play with S.C. Covilhã in both that and the third levels.

After an impressive season with F.C. Felgueiras in division two (18 goals), he signed for C.F. Belenenses in the top flight, scoring six times during half a season, his only with the club, as he finished the campaign with Montpellier HSC in the French Ligue 1, on loan, netting a further five goals in an eventual relegation, as 18th and last.

In the 2000 summer Pataca joined the Hérault side on a permanent basis, contributing with four goals for an immediate promotion back, and being irregularly used in the following top division seasons. He subsequently stayed in the country with US Créteil-Lusitanos, playing three seasons in Ligue 2 and two in the Championnat National; after only 14 games in his last two years combined, the 36-year-old retired from football.

== Manager career ==
After retiring, Pataca served as an assistant coach for his former club Créteil, under both Laurent Fournier and Hubert Velud. After two seasons, in May 2011, he was named manager of third level side Rodez AF.
