= Michaël Citony =

French footballer (born 1980)

Personal information
- Date of birth: 21 August 1980 (age 46)
- Place of birth: Villiers-le-Bel, France
- Height: 1.74 m (5 ft 9 in)
- Position: Midfielder

Youth career
- 1995–1999: Cannes

Senior career*
Years	Team	Apps	(Gls)
1999	Cannes	20	(0)
2000–2002	Rennes	6	(0)
2001–2002	→ Laval (loan)	24	(1)
2003–2004	Saint-Étienne	47	(3)
2005	Sedan	10	(0)
2005–2006	Créteil	21	(5)
2006–2008	Brussels	5	(2)
2008–2009	Urania Genève Sport	3	(0)
2009	Raja Casablanca		
2009–2010	AS Beauvais	4	(0)
2010–2011	Gueugnon	9	(0)
2012	RFC Liège	9	(0)
2012–2013	US Le Pontet	22	(5)
2013–2014	Chambly	3	(0)

International career
2004	Martinique	1	(0)
- * Club domestic league appearances and goals

Michaël Citony (born 21 August 1980) is a French former professional footballer who played as a midfielder.

== Honours ==
Saint-Étienne

- Ligue 2: 2004

Sedan

- Coupe de France runner-up: 2005
