= Bertin Tokéné =

Cameroonian-Belgian footballer

Personal information
- Date of birth: 10 May 1975 (age 51)
- Place of birth: Douala, Cameroon
- Position: Defender

Team information
- Current team: R.J.S. Heppignies-Lambusart-Fleurus
- Number: 4

Senior career*
Years	Team	Apps	(Gls)
1997–2002	Charleroi	87	(1)
2002–2005	Grenoble	78	(1)
2005–2006	Brest	24	(0)
2006–2007	Tours	22	(0)
2008–present	R.J.S. Heppignies-Lambusart-Fleurus		
- * Club domestic league appearances and goals

Bertin Tokéné (born 10 May 1975 in Douala, Cameroon) is a Cameroonian-Belgian football defender. He currently plays for R.J.S. Heppignies-Lambusart-Fleurus.
