= James Fanchone =

French footballer (born 1980)

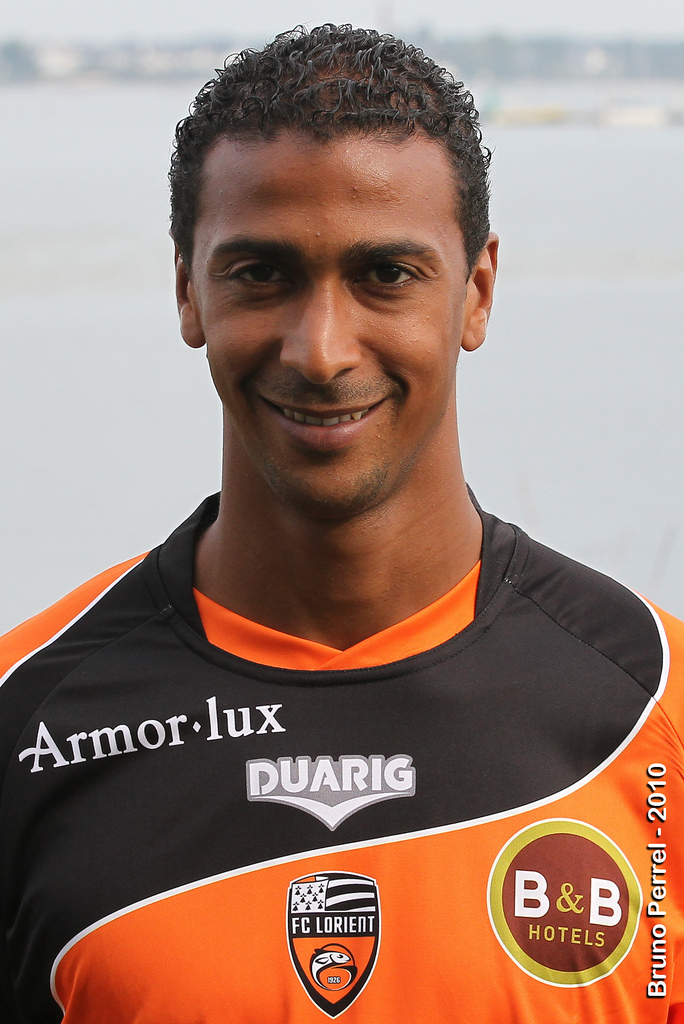

Personal information
- Date of birth: February 21, 1980 (age 46)
- Place of birth: Le Mans, France
- Height: 1.83 m (6 ft 0 in)
- Position: Striker

Youth career
- Le Mans

Senior career*
Years	Team	Apps	(Gls)
1998–2007	Le Mans	232	(43)
2007–2009	Strasbourg	66	(16)
2009–2011	Lorient	35	(1)
2011–2014	Le Havre	33	(4)
- * Club domestic league appearances and goals

James Fanchone (born 21 February 1980) is a retired French professional footballer who played as a striker.

== Career ==
Fanchone was born in Le Mans.

On 23 June 2011, he moved to Ligue 2 club Le Havre for an undisclosed fee.
