= Sergio Rojas (Argentine footballer) =

Argentine footballer

Personal information
- Full name: Ruben Sergio Rojas
- Date of birth: 22 November 1973 (age 52)
- Place of birth: Buenos Aires, Argentina
- Height: 1.73 m (5 ft 8 in)
- Position: Striker

Senior career*
Years	Team	Apps	(Gls)
1996–1998	Chaco For Ever		
1998–1999	Douglas Haig		
1999–2002	Charleroi	83	(27)
2002–2005	Grenoble	86	(23)
2005–2006	Textil Mandiyú		
2006–2007	Boca Unidos		
2008	Chaco For Ever		
2008	La Florida		
- * Club domestic league appearances and goals

Ruben Sergio Rojas (born 22 November 1973 in Buenos Aires, Argentina) is an Argentine former professional footballer who played as a striker. After retiring as a player, he worked as a scout for Tours FC in South America.
