= Robert Malm =

French-born Togolese footballer (born 1973)

- Malm in 2014

Personal information
- Full name: Robert Ismaël Kobla Malm
- Date of birth: 21 August 1973 (age 53)
- Place of birth: Dunkerque, France
- Height: 1.79 m (5 ft 10 in)
- Position: Striker

Senior career*
Years	Team	Apps	(Gls)
1991–1993	Lens	2	(0)
1993–1994	Dunkerque	7	(0)
1994–1996	Fécamp	60	(25)
1996–1997	Stade Briochin	23	(4)
1997–1998	Lorient	39	(16)
1998–1999	Toulouse	29	(2)
1999	Lorient	14	(1)
1999–2000	ASOA Valence	21	(3)
2000–2001	Gueugnon	13	(3)
2001–2002	Wasquehal	37	(10)
2002–2004	Grenoble	94	(33)
2004–2006	Brest	55	(20)
2006–2008	Montpellier	39	(5)
2008–2009	Nîmes	54	(22)
2009–2010	Cannes	10	(1)
Total		497	(145)

International career
2006–2008	Togo	2	(0)
- * Club domestic league appearances and goals

Robert Ismaël Kobla Malm (born 21 August 1973) is a former professional footballer who played as a striker. Born in France, he represented Togo at international level.

== Club career ==
Malm began his playing career with Lens, where he played for the first team from 1991 to 1993. He subsequently played for Dunkerque and Fécamp, establishing himself as a forward during his two seasons at Fécamp. In 1996, he moved to Stade Briochin, where he spent one season before joining Lorient.

The 1997–98 season at Lorient was an important period in Malm's career. He made 39 league appearances and scored 16 goals, helping the club earn promotion to Ligue 1. He subsequently moved to Toulouse, where he spent one season in Ligue 1, before playing for ASOA Valence, Gueugnon, and Wasquehal. In 2002, he joined Grenoble, where he spent around three seasons and demonstrated consistent goalscoring form, scoring 33 goals in 94 league appearances.

In 2004, Malm moved to Brest. He continued to play an important attacking role in Ligue 2, scoring 20 league goals over two seasons. After joining Montpellier in 2006, he continued to make regular appearances, scoring 10 goals in all competitions over approximately one and a half seasons.

In January 2008, Malm terminated his contract with Montpellier by mutual consent and joined Nîmes Olympique. At the time, Nîmes were playing in the Championnat National, and Malm made a major contribution to the club's promotion to Ligue 2, scoring 16 goals in 16 appearances during the second half of the 2007–08 season. He remained at Nîmes for another season following promotion, scoring six goals in 38 league appearances.

On 24 August 2009, Malm signed a two-year contract with AS Cannes. He made 10 appearances and scored one goal for Cannes, before leaving the club in early 2010 and ending his playing career. Malm spent many years in French football, playing for numerous clubs across the lower divisions and Ligue 1.

== International career ==
Malm was a member of the Togo national team and was included in Togo's squad for the 2006 FIFA World Cup. Togo were drawn in a group with South Korea, Switzerland, and France. Malm did not play in the opening match against South Korea, which Togo lost 2–1.

Malm came on as a substitute in Togo's second group-stage match against Switzerland on 19 June 2006. He replaced Chérif Touré Mamam in the 44th minute of the second half and played for approximately four minutes, as Togo lost 2–0. He did not play in the final group-stage match against France, and Togo were eliminated after losing all three of their group-stage matches.
