= 2001–02 Chamois Niortais F.C. season =

Season of a football league in France

Chamois Niortais F.C.
2001–02 season
- Head coach: Philippe Hinschberger
- Stadium: Stade René Gaillard
- French Division 2: 11th
- Coupe de France: Round of 64
- Coupe de la Ligue: First round
- Top goalscorer: League: Mahamadou Dissa; Abdelnasser Ouadah (9); All: Abdelnasser Ouadah (9)

The 2001–02 season was the 77th season in the existence of Chamois Niortais F.C. and the club's third consecutive season in the second division of French football. In addition to the domestic league, Chamois Niortais F.C. competed in this season's edition of the Coupe de France and Coupe de la Ligue. The season covered the period from 1 July 2001 to 30 June 2002.

== Players ==
=== First-team squad ===
Note: Flags indicate national team as defined under FIFA eligibility rules; some limited exceptions apply. Players may hold more than one non-FIFA nationality.

| No. | Pos. | Nation | Player |
|---|---|---|---|
| — | GK | FRA | Christophe Marichez |
| — | GK | FRA | Pascal Landais |
| — | DF | FRA | Fabien Safanjon |
| — | DF | FRA | Bertrand Piton |
| — | DF | FRA | Mickaël Lauret |
| — | DF | FRA | Benoît Maurice |
| — | DF | FRA | Mickaël Rol |
| — | DF | FRA | Mathieu Texier |
| — | DF | FRA | Philippe Souchard |
| — | DF | FRA | Jérôme Foulon |
| — | DF | FRA | Arnaud Bertheux |
| — | DF | FRA | Mathieu Blais |
| — | DF | FRA | Ludovic Mary |
| — | MF | FRA | Franck Azzopardi |
| — | MF | FRA | Jocelyn Ducloux |
| — | MF | ARG | Damian Facciuto |

| No. | Pos. | Nation | Player |
|---|---|---|---|
| — | MF | FRA | Alberto Queiros |
| — | MF | GUI | Cheick Sidia Baldé |
| — | MF | ALG | Abdelnasser Ouadah |
| — | MF | FRA | Joël Bossis |
| — | MF | BRA | Gonçales da Silva Felix |
| — | MF | FRA | Julien Jean |
| — | MF | FRA | Frédéric Mémin |
| — | FW | FRA | Frédéric Garny |
| — | FW | FRA | Samuel Michel |
| — | FW | ARG | Sebastián Cobelli |
| — | FW | ALG | Rachid Benayen |
| — | FW | GUI | Ousmane Bangoura |
| — | FW | MLI | Mahamadou Dissa |
| — | FW | ALG | Nacim Abdelali |
| — | FW | BFA | Tanguy Barro |

== Competitions ==
Win Draw Loss

=== Overall record ===
| Competition | First match | Last match | Starting round | Final position | Record | | | | | | | |
| Competition | First match | Last match | Starting round | Final position | Pld | W | D | L | GF | GA | GD | Win % |
|---|---|---|---|---|---|---|---|---|---|---|---|---|
| Division 2 | 29 July 2001 | 3 May 2002 | Matchday 1 | 11th | 38 | 11 | 15 | 12 | 40 | 39 | +1 | 28.95 |
| Coupe de France | 4 November 2001 | 14 December 2001 | Seventh round | Round of 64 | 3 | 1 | 1 | 1 | 4 | 5 | −1 | 33.33 |
| Coupe de la Ligue | 1 September 2001 | | First round | First round | 1 | 0 | 0 | 1 | 0 | 3 | −3 | 0.00 |
| Total | | | | | 42 | 12 | 16 | 14 | 44 | 47 | −3 | 28.57 |

Source: Competitions

=== French Division 2 ===
==== League table ====
| Pos | Team | Pld | W | D | L | GF | GA | GD | Pts |
|---|---|---|---|---|---|---|---|---|---|
| 9 | Nancy | 38 | 12 | 15 | 11 | 42 | 38 | +4 | 51 |
| 10 | Laval | 38 | 14 | 8 | 16 | 50 | 56 | −6 | 50 |
| 11 | Niort | 38 | 11 | 15 | 12 | 40 | 39 | +1 | 48 |
| 12 | Amiens | 38 | 11 | 14 | 13 | 46 | 50 | −4 | 47 |
| 13 | Saint-Étienne | 38 | 11 | 13 | 14 | 35 | 42 | −7 | 46 |

Source: Ligue 2

==== Results summary ====
| Overall | | | | | | | | Home | | | | | | Away | | | | | |
| Pld | W | D | L | GF | GA | GD | Pts | W | D | L | GF | GA | GD | W | D | L | GF | GA | GD |
|---|---|---|---|---|---|---|---|---|---|---|---|---|---|---|---|---|---|---|---|
| 38 | 11 | 15 | 12 | 40 | 39 | +1 | 48 | 6 | 11 | 2 | 20 | 13 | +7 | 5 | 4 | 10 | 20 | 26 | −6 |

Source: Ligue 2

==== Results by round ====
| Round | 1 | 2 | 3 | 4 | 5 | 6 | 7 | 8 | 9 | 10 | 11 | 12 | 13 | 14 | 15 | 16 | 17 | 18 | 19 | 20 | 21 | 22 | 23 | 24 | 25 | 26 | 27 | 28 | 29 | 30 | 31 | 32 | 33 | 34 | 35 | 36 | 37 | 38 |
|---|---|---|---|---|---|---|---|---|---|---|---|---|---|---|---|---|---|---|---|---|---|---|---|---|---|---|---|---|---|---|---|---|---|---|---|---|---|---|
| Ground | A | H | A | H | A | H | H | A | H | A | H | A | H | A | H | A | H | A | H | A | H | A | H | A | A | H | A | H | A | H | A | H | A | H | A | H | A | H |
| Result | D | D | W | W | L | D | D | D | D | L | L | L | D | L | L | W | D | W | D | L | D | D | W | L | L | D | D | D | L | W | W | W | L | W | L | D | W | W |
| Position | 9 | 12 | 6 | 5 | 6 | 7 | 9 | 8 | 10 | 12 | 13 | 14 | 15 | 15 | 17 | 15 | 15 | 14 | 15 | 15 | 15 | 15 | 14 | 15 | 16 | 16 | 16 | 16 | 16 | 15 | 15 | 14 | 15 | 14 | 14 | 15 | 13 | 11 |

Source: Ligue 2
A = Away; H = Home; W = Win; D = Draw; L = Loss

==== Matches ====
| 29 July 2001 1 | Martigues | 1–1 | Niort |
| --:-- CEST (UTC+2) |

| 4 August 2001 2 | Niort | 2–2 | Le Havre | Niort |
| --:-- CEST (UTC+2) | | | | Stadium: Stade René Gaillard |

| 11 August 2001 3 | Laval | 1–3 | Niort |
| --:-- CEST (UTC+2) |

| 18 August 2001 4 | Niort | 2–0 | Istres | Niort |
| --:-- CEST (UTC+2) | | | | Stadium: Stade René Gaillard |

| 25 August 2001 5 | Nice | 3–1 | Niort |
| --:-- CEST (UTC+2) |

| 29 August 2001 6 | Niort | 1–1 | Strasbourg | Niort |
| --:-- CEST (UTC+2) | | | | Stadium: Stade René Gaillard |

| 8 September 2001 7 | Niort | 0–0 | Grenoble | Niort |
| --:-- CEST (UTC+2) | | | | Stadium: Stade René Gaillard |

| 15 September 2001 8 | Nîmes | 0–0 | Niort |
| --:-- CEST (UTC+2) |

| 23 September 2001 9 | Niort | 0–0 | Beauvais | Niort |
| --:-- CEST (UTC+2) | | | | Stadium: Stade René Gaillard |

| 29 September 2001 10 | Nancy | 2–0 | Niort |
| --:-- CEST (UTC+2) |

| 5 October 2001 11 | Niort | 1–2 | Châteauroux | Niort |
| --:-- CEST (UTC+2) | | | | Stadium: Stade René Gaillard |

| 13 October 2001 12 | Caen | 2–1 | Niort |
| --:-- CEST (UTC+2) |

| 20 October 2001 13 | Niort | 1–1 | Créteil | Niort |
| --:-- CEST (UTC+2) | | | | Stadium: Stade René Gaillard |

| 27 October 2001 14 | Le Mans | 3–1 | Niort |
| --:-- CEST (UTC+2) |

| 9 November 2001 15 | Niort | 0–2 | Saint-Étienne | Niort |
| --:-- CET (UTC+1) | | | | Stadium: Stade René Gaillard |

| 13 November 2001 16 | Wasquehal | 2–3 | Niort |
| --:-- CET (UTC+1) |

| 17 November 2001 17 | Niort | 0–0 | Ajaccio | Niort |
| --:-- CET (UTC+1) | | | | Stadium: Stade René Gaillard |

| 28 November 2001 18 | Amiens | 0–2 | Niort |
| --:-- CET (UTC+1) |

| 8 December 2001 19 | Niort | 1–1 | Gueugnon | Niort |
| --:-- CET (UTC+1) | | | | Stadium: Stade René Gaillard |

| 19 December 2001 20 | Le Havre | 2–0 | Niort |
| --:-- CET (UTC+1) |

| 22 December 2001 21 | Niort | 1–1 | Laval | Niort |
| --:-- CET (UTC+1) | | | | Stadium: Stade René Gaillard |

| 5 January 2002 22 | Istres | 1–1 | Niort |
| --:-- CET (UTC+1) |

| 12 January 2002 23 | Niort | 3–0 | Nice | Niort |
| --:-- CET (UTC+1) | | | | Stadium: Stade René Gaillard |

| 23 January 2002 24 | Strasbourg | 1–0 | Niort |
| --:-- CET (UTC+1) |

| 30 January 2002 25 | Grenoble | 2–1 | Niort |
| --:-- CET (UTC+1) |

| 2 February 2002 26 | Niort | 0–0 | Nîmes | Niort |
| --:-- CET (UTC+1) | | | | Stadium: Stade René Gaillard |

| 6 February 2002 27 | Beauvais | 0–0 | Niort |
| --:-- CET (UTC+1) |

| 12 February 2002 28 | Niort | 0–0 | Nancy | Niort |
| --:-- CET (UTC+1) | | | | Stadium: Stade René Gaillard |

| 16 February 2002 29 | Châteauroux | 2–1 | Niort |
| --:-- CET (UTC+1) |

| 23 February 2002 30 | Niort | 2–0 | Caen | Niort |
| --:-- CET (UTC+1) | | | | Stadium: Stade René Gaillard |

| 6 March 2002 31 | Créteil | 1–3 | Niort |
| --:-- CET (UTC+1) |

| 16 March 2002 32 | Niort | 1–0 | Le Mans | Niort |
| --:-- CET (UTC+1) | | | | Stadium: Stade René Gaillard |

| 23 March 2002 33 | Saint-Étienne | 1–0 | Niort |
| --:-- CET (UTC+1) |

| 26 March 2002 34 | Niort | 1–0 | Wasquehal | Niort |
| --:-- CET (UTC+1) | | | | Stadium: Stade René Gaillard |

| 6 April 2002 35 | Ajaccio | 1–0 | Niort |
| --:-- CEST (UTC+2) |

| 13 April 2002 36 | Niort | 2–2 | Amiens | Niort |
| --:-- CEST (UTC+2) | | | | Stadium: Stade René Gaillard |

| 26 April 2002 37 | Gueugnon | 1–2 | Niort |
| --:-- CEST (UTC+2) |

| 3 May 2002 38 | Niort | 2–1 | Martigues | Niort |
| --:-- CEST (UTC+2) | | | | Stadium: Stade René Gaillard |

=== Coupe de France ===
| 4 November 2001 Seventh round | GSI Pontivy | 1–1 (a.e.t.) (3–4 p) | Niort |
| --:-- CET (UTC+1) | | | | Attendance: 2,300; Referee: Champet |

| December 2001 Eighth round | AF Virois | 1–2 | Niort |
| --:-- CET (UTC+1) |

| 14 December 2001 Round of 64 | Nancy | 3–1 (a.e.t.) | Niort | Tomblaine |
| 19:00 CET (UTC+1) | Dufresne 79', 114'; Hadji 104' | | Ouadah 65' | Stadium: Stade Marcel Picot; Attendance: 1,552; Referee: Philippe Kalt |

=== Coupe de la Ligue ===
| 1 September 2001 First round | Strasbourg | 3–0 | Niort | Strasbourg |
| --:-- CEST (UTC+2) | | | | Stadium: Stade de la Meinau |
