= 2004–05 Chamois Niortais F.C. season =

Chamois Niortais
2004–05 season
- President: Jacques Prévost
- Head coach: Vincent Dufour (until January 2005); Pascal Gastien (from January 2005)
- Ligue 2: 19th (relegated)
- Coupe de France: Seventh round
- Coupe de la Ligue: First round
- Top goalscorer: Jean-François Rivière (8)
- Highest home attendance: 7,508 (v. Angers, 25 February 2005)
- Lowest home attendance: 3,337 (v. Châteauroux, 25 January 2005)
- Average home league attendance: 4,458

The 2004–05 season was Chamois Niortais' 13th consecutive season in Ligue 2, the second tier of French football. The team finished second-bottom of the division with 38 points from as many matches, and were subsequently relegated to the Championnat National for the 2005–06 campaign.

== Appearances and goals ==
No.	Pos	Nat	Player	Total		Ligue 2		Coupe de la Ligue	
No.	Pos	Nat	Player	Apps	Goals	Apps	Goals	Apps	Goals
1	GK	(France) FRA	Christophe Marichez	32	0	32	0	0	0
2	DF	(France) FRA	Jérôme Foulon	29	0	26+2	0	1	0
3	DF	(France) FRA	Ludovic Mary	11	0	9+1	0	1	0
4	DF	(France) FRA	Jonathan Joseph-Augustin	34	1	33	1	1	0
5	MF	(France) FRA	David Bouard	30	0	22+7	0	1	0
6	MF	(France) FRA	Emmerick Darbelet	9	1	8+1	1	0	0
6	MF	(Nigeria) NGA	Femi Opabunmi	7	0	3+4	0	0	0
7	MF	(France) FRA	Franck Azzopardi	24	0	16+8	0	0	0
8	MF	(France) FRA	Jocelyn Ducloux	19	0	14+5	0	0	0
9	FW	(Cameroon) CMR	Stéphane Biakolo	14	2	9+5	2	0	0
9	DF	(France) FRA	Romain Ferrier	12	0	12	0	0	0
10	FW	(France) FRA	Jean-François Rivière	23	8	17+6	8	0	0
11	FW	(France) FRA	Samuel Michel	21	4	16+5	4	0	0
12	MF	(France) FRA	Stéphane Lalaoui	15	3	4+11	3	0	0
13	DF	(France) FRA	Mickaël Lauret	2	0	1+1	0	0	0
14	MF	(France) FRA	Mathieu Blais	5	1	2+2	1	0+1	0
15	MF	(France) FRA	Vincent Durand	4	0	3+1	0	0	0
16	GK	(France) FRA	Christophe Ott	2	0	2	0	0	0
17	FW	(Mali) MLI	Yaya Dissa	8	0	3+4	0	1	0
18	FW	(France) FRA	Romain Jacuzzi	4	0	1+2	0	0+1	0
19	FW	(France) FRA	Guillaume Deschamps	17	4	11+6	4	0	0
20	MF	(Argentina) ARG	Damian Facciuto	25	1	19+5	1	1	0
21	DF	(France) FRA	Malik Couturier	34	0	32+1	0	1	0
22	MF	(France) FRA	Julien Féret	32	2	27+4	2	1	0
23	DF	(Ivory Coast) CIV	Julien N'Da	18	0	16+2	0	0	0
24	DF	(France) FRA	Christophe Jallet	37	4	35+1	4	1	0
25	DF	(France) FRA	Jérôme Cellier	2	0	2	0	0	0
26	MF	(France) FRA	David Coulibaly	17	0	16+1	0	0	0
27	FW	(France) FRA	Stéphane Robinet	19	3	7+11	3	1	0
28	GK	(France) FRA	Eric Allibert	6	0	4+1	0	1	0
29	FW	(France) FRA	Aïmane El Gueribi	7	0	1+5	0	0+1	0
30	GK	(France) FRA	Florian Ait Ali	0	0	0	0	0	0
31	FW	(Nigeria) NGA	James Obiorah (on loan from Lokomotiv Moscow)	12	4	9+3	4	0	0
32	MF	(France) FRA	Ronan Biger	1	0	0+1	0	0	0
33	MF	(France) FRA	Romain Vincelot	3	0	3	0	0	0
	MF	(Benin) BEN	Romuald Boco	2	0	2	0	0	0
	MF	(Brazil) BRA	Gonçales da Silva Felix	1	0	0+1	0	0	0

== Ligue 2 ==
=== League table ===
Pos	Team	Pld	W	D	L	GF	GA	GD	Pts	Promotion or Relegation
16	Reims	38	10	13	15	34	55	−21	43	
17	Le Havre	38	11	9	18	28	42	−14	42	
18	Clermont	38	8	15	15	34	39	−5	39	
19	Niort (R)	38	10	8	20	40	52	−12	38	Relegation to Championnat National [fr]
20	Angers (R)	38	8	14	16	32	44	−12	38	Relegation to Championnat National [fr]

Source: Ligue 2
(R) Relegated

=== Matches ===
9 August 2004 1	Le Havre	1–2	Chamois Niortais	Stade Jules Deschaseaux, Le Havre
20:30	Lesage 24'		Biakolo 30'; Michel 70'	Attendance: 7,519; Referee: Améziane Khendek

13 August 2004 2	Chamois Niortais	1–3	Grenoble	Stade René Gaillard, Niort
20:00	Michel 19'		Buengo 17'; Danic 43'; Malm 64'	Attendance: 4,228; Referee: Éric Brocas

17 August 2004 3	Brest	1–0	Chamois Niortais	Stade Francis-Le Blé, Brest
20:00	Fortuné 13'			Attendance: 9,222; Referee: Philippe Malige

20 August 2004 4	Chamois Niortais	3–0	Sedan	Stade René Gaillard, Niort
20:00	Joseph-Augustin 39'; Michel 42'; Darbelet 48'			Attendance: 3,357; Referee: Jérôme Auroux

27 August 2004 5	Châteauroux	2–0	Chamois Niortais	Stade Gaston Petit, Châteauroux
20:00	Mulenga 28', 61'			Attendance: 4,913; Referee: Olivier Lamarre

3 September 2004 6	Chamois Niortais	0–1	Montpellier	Stade René Gaillard, Niort
20:00			Chakouri 61'	Attendance: 3,809; Referee: Stéphane Djouzi

11 September 2004 7	Dijon	2–1	Chamois Niortais	Stade Gaston Gérard, Dijon
17:00	Asuar 33'; Joseph-Augustin 84' (o.g.)		Michel 86'	Attendance: 4,810; Referee: Lionel Jaffredo

19 September 2004 8	Chamois Niortais	0–1	Troyes	Stade René Gaillard, Niort
17:45			Nivet 47'	Attendance: 3,419; Referee: Jean-Marc Bonnin

22 September 2004 9	Angers	1–2	Chamois Niortais	Stade Jean Bouin, Angers
20:30	Bošković 41' (yellow card) 72' (red card)		Robinet 38'; Rivière 83'	Attendance: 4,669; Referee: Yves Brizou

25 September 2004 10	Chamois Niortais	4–0	Lorient	Stade René Gaillard, Niort
20:00	Robinet 28', 33'; Féret 51'; Rivière 74'			Attendance: 3,421; Referee: Pascal Garibian

1 October 2004 11	Nancy	3–1	Chamois Niortais	Stade Marcel Picot, Nancy
20:00	Fayolle 59', 63'; Dufresne 81'		Féret 48'	Attendance: 11,571; Referee: Jérôme Auroux

15 October 2004 12	Chamois Niortais	1–0	Guingamp	Stade René Gaillard, Niort
20:00	Biakolo 72'			Attendance: 3,471; Referee: Pascal Viléo

22 October 2004 13	Laval	1–0	Chamois Niortais	Stade Francis Le Basser, Laval
20:00	Deblock 29'			Attendance: 3,923; Referee: Laurent Duhamel

29 October 2004 14	Amiens	4–1	Chamois Niortais	Stade de la Licorne, Amiens
20:00	Čustović 9', 71', 79'; Buron 57'		Rivière 86'; Couturier (red card) 61'	Attendance: 6,324; Referee: Bruno Derrien

5 November 2004 15	Chamois Niortais	0–2	Clermont Foot	Stade René Gaillard, Niort
20:00			Poyet 12'; Gallon 67'	Attendance: 3,504; Referee: Laurent Rossignol

12 November 2006 16	Créteil	0–1	Chamois Niortais	Stade Dominique Duvauchelle, Créteil
20:00			Jallet 72'	Attendance: 1,636; Referee: Stéphane Djouzi

26 November 2004 17	Chamois Niortais	0–1	Reims	Stade René Gaillard, Niort
20:00			Viale 58'	Attendance: 4,171; Referee: Olivier Thual

3 December 2004 18	Le Mans	1–0	Chamois Niortais	Stade Omnisports Léon Bollée, Le Mans
20:00	Lucau 84'		Joseph-Augustin (yellow card) 39' (red card)	Attendance: 5,863; Referee: Sandryk Biton

17 December 2004 19	Chamois Niortais	1–1	Gueugnon	Stade René Gaillard, Niort
20:00	Facciuto 57' (pen.)		Baléguhé 20'	Attendance: 4,109; Referee: Alexandre Castro

11 January 2005 20	Grenoble	5–1	Chamois Niortais	Stade Lesdiguières, Grenoble
20:00	Rojas 23'; Oliseh 47'; Tokéné 52'; Akrour 65'; Danic 84' (pen.)		Deschamps 29' (pen.)	Attendance: 4,185; Referee: Jérôme Auroux

14 January 2005 21	Chamois Niortais	1–1	Brest	Stade René Gaillard, Niort
20:00	Jallet 13'; Joseph-Augustin (red card) 89'		Malm 89' (pen.)	Attendance: 4,976; Referee: Jean-Charles Cailleux

21 January 2005 22	Sedan	0–0	Chamois Niortais	Stade Louis Dugauguez, Sedan
20:00				Attendance: 7,485; Referee: Franck Guillon

25 January 2005 23	Chamois Niortais	0–0	Châteauroux	Stade René Gaillard, Niort
20:00				Attendance: 3,337; Referee: Gaël Lecellier

29 January 2005 24	Montpellier	2–0	Chamois Niortais	Stade de la Mosson, Montpellier
20:00	Atik 21'; Bugnet 75'			Attendance: 5,570; Referee: Bertrand Layec

4 February 2005 25	Chamois Niortais	0–0	Dijon	Stade René Gaillard, Niort
20:00				Attendance: 5,544; Referee: Jean-Marc Rodolphe

18 February 2005 26	Troyes	1–1	Chamois Niortais	Stade de l'Aube, Troyes
20:00	Perrone 62'		Jallet 47'	Attendance: 6,572; Referee: Lionel Jaffredo

25 February 2005 27	Chamois Niortais	0–0	Angers	Stade René Gaillard, Niort
20:00				Attendance: 7,508; Referee: Philippe Kalt

4 March 2005 28	Lorient	0–3	Chamois Niortais	Stade du Moustoir, Lorient
20:00			Match awarded to Niort	Attendance: 6,094; Referee: Olivier Thual

11 March 2005 29	Chamois Niortais	1–2	Nancy	Stade René Gaillard, Niort
20:00	Rivière 27' (pen.)		Dufresne 8' (pen.); Berenguer 88'	Attendance: 3,344; Referee: Stéphane Bré

18 March 2005 30	Guingamp	3–1	Chamois Niortais	Stade du Roudourou, Guingamp
20:00	Dagano 46'; Robert 56'; Fauré 68'		Rivière 72'	Attendance: 9,401; Referee: Bruno Ruffray

1 April 2005 31	Chamois Niortais	2–0	Laval	Stade René Gaillard, Niort
20:00	Deschamps 7'; Obiorah 90'			Attendance: 6,347; Referee: Jean-Marc Bonnin

8 April 2005 32	Chamois Niortais	3–1	Amiens	Stade René Gaillard, Niort
20:00	Obiorah 27', 34'; Rivière 46'		Camara 59'; Leroy (yellow card) 75' (red card)	Attendance: 4,964; Referee: Yves Brizou

15 April 2005 33	Clermont Foot	2–0	Chamois Niortais	Stade Gabriel Montpied, Clermont-Ferrand
20:00	Samson 34', 80'			Attendance: 4,921; Referee: Stéphane Bré

22 April 2005 34	Chamois Niortais	2–2	Créteil	Stade René Gaillard, Niort
20:00	Rivière 21'; Deschamps 90'		Dobo 31'; Boulebda 39'	Attendance: 3,687; Referee: Lionel Jaffredo

6 May 2005 35	Reims	2–0	Chamois Niortais	Stade Auguste Delaune, Reims
20:00	Delmotte 83' (pen.); Diané 89'; Leroy (red card) 86'			Attendance: 6,036; Referee: Sandryk Biton

13 May 2005 36	Chamois Niortais	0–3	Le Mans	Stade René Gaillard, Niort
20:00			Périatambée 46'; Fanchone 72'; Baradji 81'	Attendance: 7,152; Referee: Améziane Khendek

20 May 2005 37	Gueugnon	2–1	Chamois Niortais	Stade Jean Laville, Gueugnon
20:00	Gomez 42'; Sylla 43'		Deschamps 45' (pen.)	Attendance: 3,218; Referee: Serge Fidri

27 May 2005 38	Chamois Niortais	6–1	Le Havre	Stade René Gaillard, Niort
20:45	Jallet 22'; Rivière 36' (pen.); Lalaoui 38' (pen.), 41', 50'; Blais 40'		Mocquet 78'	Attendance: 4,181; Referee: Franck Guillon

== Coupe de France ==
20 November 2004 Seventh round	Chamois Niortais	0–1	Libourne	Stade René Gaillard, Niort
			Castant 86'

== Coupe de la Ligue ==
8 October 2004 First round	Dijon	1–0	Chamois Niortais	Stade Gaston Gérard, Dijon
20:00	Heitzmann 59'			Attendance: 2,173; Referee: Serge Fidri
