= List of Chamois Niortais FC players =

Chamois Niortais FC was a professional association football club based in Niort, France. The club was founded in 1925 and initially played in regional leagues around western France. It turned professional in 1985 when the team joined Division 2 and two seasons later, they were promoted to the top tier of French football for the first time in their history. Chamois Niortais lost its professional status in the summer of 2009 when the team was relegated from the Championnat National, but regained it three years later following promotion back to Ligue 2. The following list recognises all the players who appeared at least 100 times in the league for Chamois Niortais 1985 until its dissolution in 2025.

The record holder for the highest number of league appearances is midfielder Franck Azzopardi, who played 435 league games for the side between 1989 and 2005. Joël Bossis holds the record for most league goals, scoring a total of 51 during his six seasons with the club.

== Players ==
As of 8 February 2020

Name	Nationality	Pos	Years	Appearances	Goals	Notes	Ref
Franck Azzopardi	France	MF	1989–2005	435	25	Later assistant manager of Chamois Niortais	
Benoît Beaumet	France	DF	1989–1999	293	11		
Jimmy Roye	France	MF	2011–2018	246	44		
Karim Fradin	France	MF	1990–1998	237	4	First team coach at Chamois Niortais	
Joël Bossis	France	FW	1996–2002	205	51		
Quentin Bernard	France	DF	2008–2015	200	3		
Cyrille Courtin	France	DF	1989–1997	196	7		
Arnaud Gonzalez	France	FW	2006–2013	194	41		
Bertrand Piton	France	DF	1997–2004	193	3		
Christophe Marichez	France	GK	2000–2005	186	0		
Olivier Brochard	France	DF	1990–1997	185	1		
Mouhamadou Diaw	Senegal	MF	2009–2015	182	22	Senegal international	
Ousmane Bangoura	Guinea	MF	1997–2004	181	20	Guinea international	
Djibril Konaté	Mali	DF	2005–2008; 2009–2013	178	6		
Jean-Philippe Faure	France	MF	1993–1998	176	9		
Andé Dona Ndoh	Cameroon	FW	2014–2019	172	61	All-time record goalscorer	
Armindo Ferreira	France	MF	1991–1999	164	15		
Simon Hébras	France	FW	2007–2015	158	33		
Mickaël Lauret	France	DF	1994–2006	158	0	Later youth team coach at Chamois Niortais	
Luigi Glombard	France	FW	2008–2009; 2010–2014	156	28		
Anthony Gauvin	France	DF	1991–1997	156	3		
Paul Delecroix	France	GK	2011–2016	155	0		
Vincent Durand	France	MF	2004–2007; 2009–2013	148	2		
Malik Couturier	France	DF	2002–2008	141	5		
Johan Gastien	France	MF	2007–2013	140	14	Son of Pascal Gastien	
Pascal Gastien	France	DF	1982–1988; 1989–1990	139	17	Later manager of Chamois Niortais, father of Johan Gastien	
Matthieu Sans	France	DF	2014–2020	139	3		
Damian Facciuto	Argentina	MF	2000–2005	136	10		
Johan Letzelter	France	DF	2009–2014	136	1		
Franck Mérelle	France	GK	1986–1990	135	0		
Grégory Malicki	France	GK	1995–1999	134	0		
Damien Bridonneau	France	DF	1993–2000	133	3		
Philippe Violeau	France	MF	1987–1993	128	11		
Pascal Braud	France	DF	1997–2001	126	6		
Jérôme Foulon	France	DF	2001–2005	124	1		
Frédéric Bong	Cameroon	DF	2011–2016	120	2		
Ludovic Mary	France	DF	2000–2005	119	3		
Ronan Biger	France	MF	2004–2009	117	4		
Djiman Koukou	Benin	MF	2013–2016	117	3	Benin international	
David Djigla	Benin	MF	2015–2021	114	8	Benin international	
David Lollia	France	MF	1990–1995	113	3		
Tristan Lahaye	France	DF	2012–2017	112	0		
Jean-François Rivière	France	FW	2004–2008	111	27		
Alberto Queiros	France	MF	1997–2003	111	8		
Romain Ferrier	France	DF	2005–2008	111	2		
Saturnin Allagbé	Benin	GK	2014–2020	110	0	Benin international	
Walquir Mota	Brazil	FW	1995–1998	108	31		
Fabien Safanjon	France	DF	1999–2004	108	4		
Alain Bonnafous	France	DF	1992–1995	108	0		
Jérémy Choplin	France	DF	2015–2018	105	6		
Thomas Debenest	France	GK	1991–1997	102	0		
