= Sidia =

Sidia is a given name. Notable people with the name include:

- Sidia Jatta (born 1945), Gambian politician
- Cheick Sidia Baldé (born 1983), Guinean footballer

== See also ==
- I Made Sidia, Balinese puppeteer
