= Biakolo =

Biakolo is a surname. Notable people with the surname include:

- Kévin Keben Biakolo (born 2004), Cameroonian football centre-back
- Stéphane Biakolo (born 1982), French football forward
