= Richard Boucher (disambiguation) =

Richard Boucher (1951–2025) was an American diplomat.

Richard or Dick Boucher may also refer to:

- Richard Boucher (footballer) (1932–2017), French soccer defender
- Dick Boucher, participant for Rhodesia in the 1976 World Outdoor Bowls Championship

== See also ==
- Rick Boucher (Frederick Carlyle Boucher, born 1946), member of the U.S. House of Representatives
