= Hatz (surname) =

Hatz is a surname. Notable people with the surname include:

- Beatriz Hatz (born 2000), American Paralympic athlete
- Christopher Hatz (born 1991), German racing cyclist
- Georges Hatz (1917–2007), French football player and manager
- Michael Hatz (born 1970), Austrian footballer

== See also ==
- Hatz, German engine manufacturer founded by Mathias Hatz
- Hátszeghy, Hungarian surname
