= Brochard =

Brochard is a French surname. Notable people with the surname include:

- Jean Brochard (1893–1972), French actor
- Laurent Brochard (born 1968), French cyclist
- Martine Brochard (1944–2025), French actress and writer
- Olivier Brochard (born 1967), French footballer and manager
- Victor Brochard (1848–1907), French philosopher

== Srr also ==
- Françoise Brochard-Wyart (born 1944), French theoretical physicist
