= Piton (disambiguation) =

Piton is a rock climbing tool.

Piton or Pitons may also refer to:

- Piton (surname)
- Piton (beer), a Pilsner beer from Saint Lucia
- Piton, Mauritius, a region in Rivière du Rempart District
  - Piton State College, a school in Piton, Mauritius
- Mons Piton, an isolated mountain on the Moon
- Piton Island, Curzon Islands, Antarctica
- Pitons (film), see Laila Pakalniņa#Filmography
- Pitons (Saint Lucia), two mountainous volcanic plugs in Saint Lucia: Gros Piton and Petit Piton
- Pitons, cirques and remparts of Reunion Island, a UNESCO World Heritage Site

== See also ==
- Carbet Mountains, Pitons Du Carbet, Martinique
- Piton de la Fournaise, a volcano in Réunion
- Piton de la Petite Rivière Noire, a mountain in Mauritius
- Piton des Neiges, a volcano in Réunion
- Piton Sainte-Rose, a town in Réunion
