= 1957 Coupe de France final =

Final of the 1956–57 edition of the Coupe de France

- Event: 1956–57 Coupe de France
Toulouse	Angers
6	3
- Date: 26 May 1957
- Venue: Olympique Yves-du-Manoir, Colombes
- Referee: (England) Jack Clough
- Attendance: 43,125

The 1957 Coupe de France final was a football match held at Stade Olympique Yves-du-Manoir, Colombes on May 26, 1957, that saw Toulouse claim their first Coupe de France title by defeating Angers 6–3 thanks to goals by René Dereuddre (2), Abdelhamid Bouchouk, Robert Bocchi, Eduardo Di Loreto and Said Brahimi. The match referee was Englishman Jack Clough; this is the only Coupe de France final officiated by a non-French referee to date.

It was the only Coupe de France won by the original Toulouse FC (1937), which was dissolved in 1967. An unrelated club of the same name, Toulouse FC, would win the cup for the first time in 2023.

== Match details ==
26 May 1957

Toulouse	6–3	Angers
Dereuddre 11', 24'; Bouchouk 28'; Bocchi 61'; Di Loreto 85'; Brahimi 89'		Biancheri 35'; Boucher 83' (o.g.); Bourignault 88'

Stade Olympique Yves-du-Manoir, Colombes
Attendance: 43,125
Referee: (England) Jack Clough

GK	(France) Guy Roussel
DF	(France) Richard Boucher
DF	(France) Guy Nungesser
DF	(France) Robert Bocchi
DF	(France) René Pleimelding	(c)
MF	(France) Pierre Cahuzac
MF	(Algeria) Said Brahimi
MF	(France) René Dereuddre
MF	(Argentina) Eduardo Di Loreto
FW	(Finland) Aulis Rytkönen
FW	(Algeria) Abdelhamid Bouchouk
Manager:
(France) Jules Bigot Assistant Referees: Fourth Official:

GK	(France) Eugène Fragassi
DF	(France) Wladislaw Kowalski
DF	(France) Antoine Pasquini
DF	(France) Casimir Hnatow
DF	(France) Jules Sbroglia	(c)
MF	(France) Claude Bourrignault
MF	(France) Alphonse Le Gall
FW	(Austria) Kurt Schindlauer
FW	(France) Jean Tison
FW	(France) Henri Biancheri
FW	(France) Marcel Loncle
Manager:
(France) (Austria) Walter Presch
