= Frédéric Mémin =

French footballer (born 1979)

Personal information
- Full name: Frédéric Mémin
- Date of birth: October 13, 1979 (age 47)
- Place of birth: Poitiers, France
- Height: 1.80 m (5 ft 11 in)
- Position: Midfielder

Senior career*
Years	Team	Apps	(Gls)
1997–2000	Auxerre B	21	(1)
2000–2002	Chamois Niortais	10	(1)
2002–2003	Châtellerault	23	(0)
2003–2005	La Rochelle	?	(?)
2006–2008	Poitiers	?	(?)

International career
	France U17	2	(0)
- * Club domestic league appearances and goals

Frédéric Mémin (born October 13, 1979) is a retired professional footballer. He played as a midfielder.

Mémin made 9 appearances in Ligue 2 with Niort.

== See also ==
- Football in France
- List of football clubs in France
