= Stéphane Lalaoui =

French footballer (born 1981)

Personal information
- Full name: Stéphane Lalaoui
- Date of birth: 15 April 1981 (age 45)
- Place of birth: Le Pont-de-Beauvoisin, France
- Height: 1.65 m (5 ft 5 in)
- Position: Midfielder

Senior career*
Years	Team	Apps	(Gls)
1999–2001	Lyon B	3	(1)
2001–2002	Lyon-Duchère		
2002–2004	Bourg-en-Bresse	40	(5)
2004–2006	Chamois Niortais	37	(4)
2006–2009	Rouen	61	(3)
2009–2010	Aurillac	0	(0)
2010–2012	Béziers	55	(9)
2012–2018	Paulhan-Pézenas		
- * Club domestic league appearances and goals

Stéphane Lalaoui (born 15 April 1981) is a French former professional footballer who played as a midfielder.

== Career ==
Lalaoui played professionally for Chamois Niortais between 2004 and 2006. He joined Aurillac on a free transfer on 8 July 2009 from Rouen.
