= Arnaud Bertheux =

French footballer (born 1977)

Personal information
- Full name: Arnaud Bertheux
- Date of birth: January 27, 1977 (age 49)
- Place of birth: Mont-de-Marsan, France
- Height: 1.75 m (5 ft 9 in)
- Position: Defender

Team information
- Current team: Luçon

Senior career*
Years	Team	Apps	(Gls)
1997–2003	Chamois Niortais	40	(1)
2003–2004	Wasquehal	20	(0)
2004–2005	Orléans	20	(0)
2005–	Luçon	?	(?)
- * Club domestic league appearances and goals

Arnaud Bertheux (born January 27, 1977) is a footballer currently playing for Vendée Luçon Football in the Championnat de France amateur.
