= Hátszeghy =

Hátszeghy is a Hungarian surname, created from 'Hatz'. Notable people with the surname include:

- Ottó Hátszeghy (1902–1977), Hungarian fencer
- József Hátszeghy (1904–1988), Hungarian fencer, brother of Ottó

== See also ==
- Hatz (surname), German surname
