= Guillaume Deschamps =

French footballer (born 1978)

Personal information
- Full name: Guillaume Deschamps
- Date of birth: 23 November 1978 (age 47)
- Place of birth: Marseille, France
- Height: 1.81 m (5 ft 11 1/2 in)
- Position: Striker

Senior career*
Years	Team	Apps	(Gls)
1997–2003	Marseille	1	(0)
2000–2001	→ Gazélec Ajaccio	26	(7)
2002–2003	→ Châteauroux	30	(15)
2003–2005	Sedan	45	(5)
2004–2005	→ Niort	17	(4)
2005–2007	Laval	16	(1)
2007	1. FC Saarbrücken	4	(0)
2007–2008	Toulouse Fontaine	?	(?)
2008–2009	Consolat Marseille	?	(?)
- * Club domestic league appearances and goals

Guillaume Deschamps (born 23 November 1978) is a French former footballer who played as a striker.
