= Eduardo Di Loreto =

Argentine footballer (1929–2010)

Personal information
- Date of birth: 28 October 1929
- Place of birth: Villa Mugueta, Argentina
- Date of death: 20 February 2010 (aged 80)
- Place of death: Santa Fe, Argentina
- Height: 1.81 m (5 ft 11 in)
- Position: Forward

Senior career*
Years	Team	Apps	(Gls)
1949	Rosario Central		
1950	Ferro Carril Oeste		
1951–1952	Rosario Central		
1952	Sarmiento		
1952–1953	São Paulo		
1953–1955	Le Havre		
1955–1958	Toulouse		
1958–1960	Le Havre		
1960–1961	Blois		

Managerial career
- 1962–1963: Le Havre
- 1963–1964: Blois
- * Club domestic league appearances and goals

Eduardo Di Loreto (28 October 1929 – 20 February 2010) was an Argentine professional football player and manager, who played as a forward.

== Playing career ==
A forward who stood out for his headed goals, Di Loreto began his career at Rosario Central in 1949. In 1950, after a spell at Ferro Carril Oeste, he returned to the team with which he was champion of Primera B in 1951. He also had a spell at Sarminento de Júnin and a quick trip to Brazilian football, at São Paulo FC.

In 1953, he arrived in French football where he played most of his career, in special for Le Havre AC and Toulouse FC, teams, for which he won the Coupe de France.

== Managerial career ==
As a coach, Di Loreto managed the teams of Le Havre AC and AAJ Blois, having achieved 4th place in the 1962–63 French Division 2 as his best result.

== Honours ==
Rosario Central

- Primera B: 1951

Toulouse

- Coupe de France: 1956–57

Le Havre

- Ligue 2: 1958–59
- Coupe de France: 1958–59
