= Abdelnasser Ouadah =

Algerian footballer (born 1975)

Abdel Ouadah
Personal information
- Full name: Abdelnasser Ouadah
- Date of birth: 13 September 1975 (age 51)
- Place of birth: Forbach, France
- Height: 1.75 m (5 ft 9 in)
- Position: Defender

Senior career*
Years	Team	Apps	(Gls)
1991–2000	Nancy	95	(6)
1996–1997	→ Épinal (loan)	21	(1)
2000–2002	Niort	61	(16)
2002–2005	Ajaccio	80	(5)
2005–2006	Metz	28	(2)
2006	Sedan	13	(1)
2007–2009	Montpellier	34	(1)
2010	LB Châteauroux	3	(0)
2010–2011	FC Istres	10	(0)

International career^{‡}
2004	Algeria	1	(0)
- * Club domestic league appearances and goals as of 00:00, 28 April 2011 (UTC) ‡ National team caps and goals as of 00:00, 28 April 2011 (UTC)

Abdelnasser Ouadah (Arabic: عبدالناصر وضاح; born 13 September 1975) is a former footballer. Born in France, he played for the Algeria national team.

== Career ==
Ouadah played for Nancy, Épinal, Niort, AC Ajaccio, FC Metz, CS Sedan Ardennes and Montpellier. The 34-year-old midfielder left after six months with LB Châteauroux and joined to FC Istres.

== International career ==
He was originally part of the Algerian 2004 African Nations Cup team who finished second in their group in the first round of competition before being defeated by Morocco in the quarter-finals. However, he left the team after their first group game against Cameroon when the coach decided to bring in Hocine Achiou and leave him on the bench. He was called up to the team on two more occasions but did not reply present to either one of them.

== National team statistics ==
Algeria national team
Year	Apps	Goals
2004	1	0
Total	1	0

== Personal life ==
His brother, Mohamed, is a soccer trainer in Moselle.
