= Éric Allibert =

French footballer (born 1976)

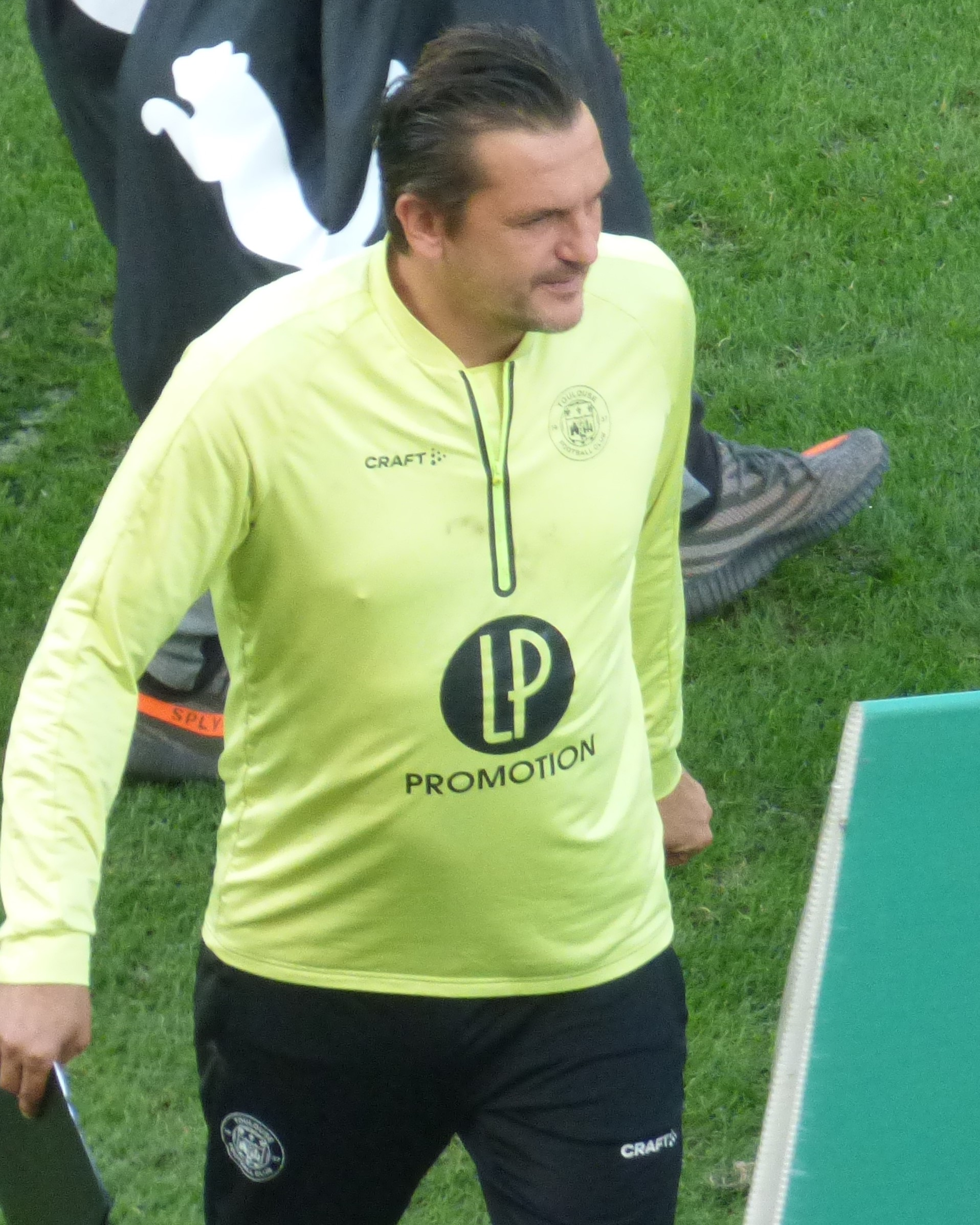
- Allibert with Toulouse in 2023

Personal information
- Full name: Éric Allibert
- Date of birth: 11 June 1976 (age 50)
- Place of birth: Vaison-la-Romaine, France
- Height: 1.87 m (6 ft 2 in)
- Position: Goalkeeper

Team information
- Current team: Toulouse (goalkeeping coach)

Senior career*
Years	Team	Apps	(Gls)
1994–1998	Nîmes	34	(0)
1998–2002	Lille	12	(0)
2002–2004	Valence	61	(0)
2004–2005	Niort	5	(0)
2005–2007	Rouen	36	(0)
2007–2010	Dunkerque	55	(0)
- * Club domestic league appearances and goals

Éric Allibert (born 11 June 1976) is a French former footballer who played as a goalkeeper. He is currently a goalkeeping coach for Ligue 1 club Toulouse.
