= Abdelhamid Bouchouk =

Algerian footballer (1927-2004)

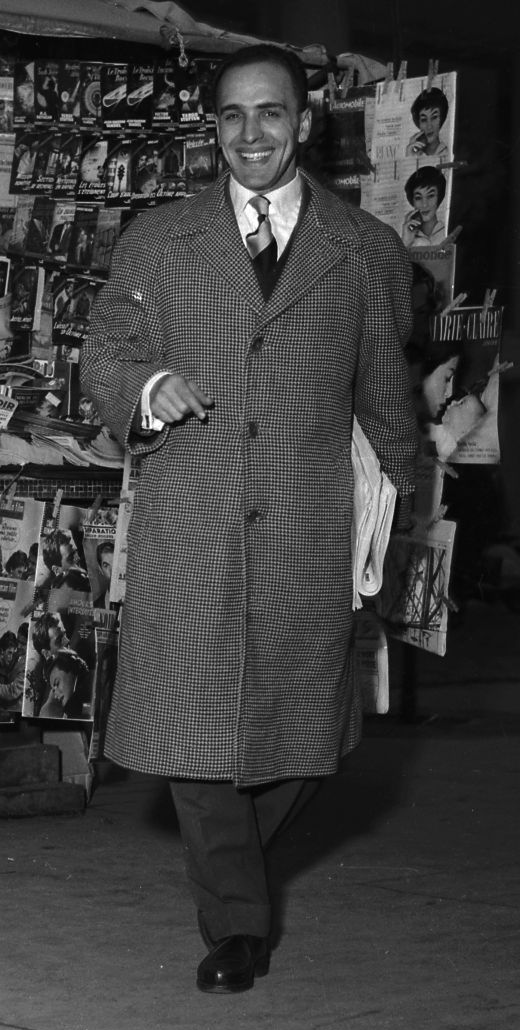

Sport
- Country: Algeria
- Sport: association football
- Club: 1948–1949: FC Sète; 1949–1951: Olympique Marseille; 1951–1958: Toulouse FC
- Team: Algerian FLN team

Abdelhamid Bouchouk (1 January 1927, Azzaba, Algeria – 9 October 2004, Toulouse, France) was an Algerian footballer. He played as a winger.

Bouchouk was a member of the Algerian FLN team from 1958 to 1962.

== Club career ==
- 1948–1949: FC Sète (France)
- 1949–1951: Olympique Marseille (France)
- 1951–1958: Toulouse FC (France)

== Honours ==
- Won the Ligue 2 Championship once with Toulouse FC in 1953
- Won the Coupe de France once with Toulouse FC in 1957, scoring a goal in the final
