= Toulouse FC =

Association football club in France

Toulouse
- Full name: Toulouse Football Club
- Nicknames: Le Téfécé; Les Violets (The Violets); Le Tef; Les Pitchouns (The Little Ones)
- Short name: TFC
- Founded: 1970; 56 years ago
- Stadium: Stadium de Toulouse
- Capacity: 33,150
- Coordinates: 43°34′59″N 1°26′3″E
- Owner: RedBird Capital Partners (85%)
- President: Olivier Cloarec
- Head coach: Jens Berthel Askou
- League: Ligue 1
- 2025–26: Ligue 1, 9th of 18
- Website: www.toulousefc.com
Home colours	Away colours

Toulouse Football Club (Occitan: Tolosa Fotbòl Club) is a French professional football club based in Toulouse. The club was founded in 1970 and currently plays in Ligue 1, the first division of French football. Toulouse plays its home matches at the Stadium de Toulouse located within the city.

Les Violets won the Coupe de France in 2023, and have won the second tier Ligue 2 on three occasions. Toulouse have participated in European competition six times, including in 2007 when they qualified for the UEFA Champions League for the first time.

The current president of Toulouse FC is Olivier Cloarec, who was appointed following previous president Damien Comolli's departure in July 2025. Comolli succeeded the French businessman Olivier Sadran, who took over the club following its bankruptcy in 2001 which resulted in it being relegated to the Championnat National. The club has served as a springboard for several players, most notably the World Cup-winning goalkeeper Fabien Barthez, international strikers André-Pierre Gignac, Martin Braithwaite and Wissam Ben Yedder.

== History ==
=== Origin (1937-1982) ===
Toulouse FC was preceded by the identically named Toulouse FC, founded in 1937. This previous iteration of the club dissolved in 1967, selling its players and place in the French top flight to Paris outfit Red Star. Three years later, in 1970, a new club, Union Sportive Toulouse, rose from the ashes. Adopting red and yellow jerseys, the club started out in Ligue 2 and in 1979 reclaimed its current name, Toulouse FC.

=== Promotion to Division 1 & Europe (1982-1994) ===
Now wearing purple and white, Les Pitchouns gained top-flight promotion in 1982. A side containing Jacques Santini and Swiss forward Daniel Jeandupeux earned a penalty shoot-out victory against Diego Maradona's Napoli in the 1986–87 UEFA Cup, Toulouse's maiden European campaign.

=== Relegation from Division 1 to National 1 (1994-2003) ===
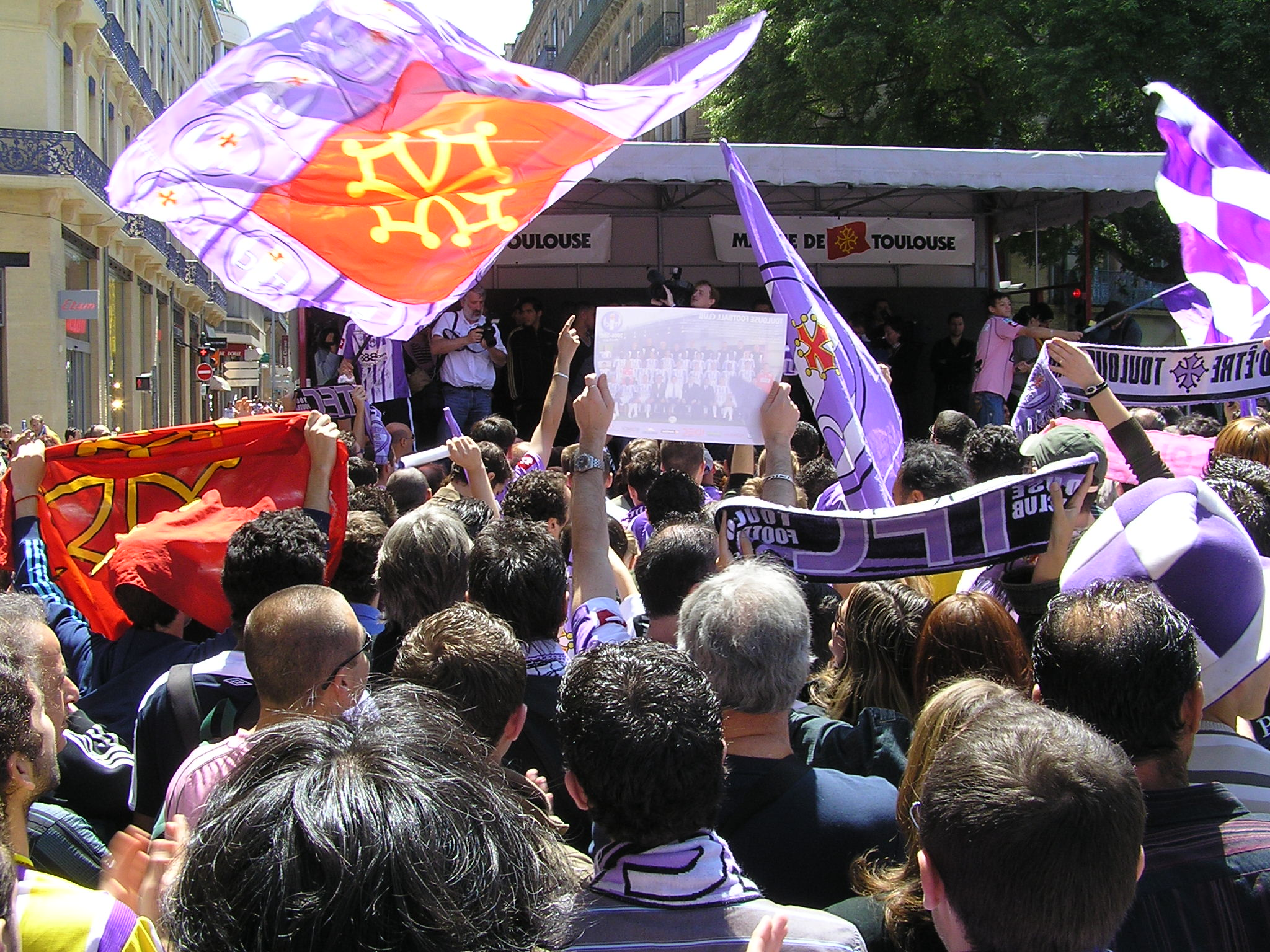
Toulouse fans celebrate qualifying for the 2007–08 UEFA Champions League

After goalkeeper Fabien Barthez made his breakthrough and moved on, Toulouse were relegated in 1994. They subsequently bounced back and forth between Division 1 and Division 2 before slipping to the third flight in 2001 after financial problems.

=== Return to Ligue 1 (2003-2020) ===
Toulouse were back in the top flight two seasons later, and in 2007 they finished third to earn a place in the 2007–08 UEFA Champions League third qualifying round. There, Liverpool overpowered them 5–0 on aggregate.

In 2008–09, Toulouse finished fourth in the Ligue 1 table with 64 points, and secured a spot in the new Europa League, while André-Pierre Gignac led all scorers in Ligue 1 with 24 goals and was awarded a call-up to the France national team.

In the 2015–16 Ligue 1 season, Toulouse avoided relegation to Ligue 2 in the last game of the season. With 12 minutes to go, Toulouse were behind to Angers 2–1 and needed a win to survive, and scored two late goals and won the match 3–2. Two years later, they finished 18th and won the promotion/relegation playoff 4–0 on aggregate against Ligue 2's AC Ajaccio.

=== Sale of the club & Coupe de France (2020-present) ===
On 6 January 2020, Toulouse dismissed manager Antoine Kombouaré following the club's 1–0 loss to Championnat National 2 side Saint-Pryvé Saint-Hilaire in the Coupe de France. Under Kombouaré the club had lost ten matches in a row, leading him to be dismissed and replaced by Denis Zanko. On 30 April that year, Toulouse were relegated to Ligue 2 after the LFP elected to end the season early due to the coronavirus pandemic.

On 21 July 2020, RedBird Capital Partners acquired an 85% stake in Toulouse FC. The club achieved promotion back to Ligue 1 by winning the second tier, Ligue 2, in 2022. On 29 April 2023, Toulouse won its first-ever Coupe de France title, defeating Kombouaré's Nantes in the final by a score of 5–1. It was the city's second title as the former Toulouse FC had won it back in 1957.

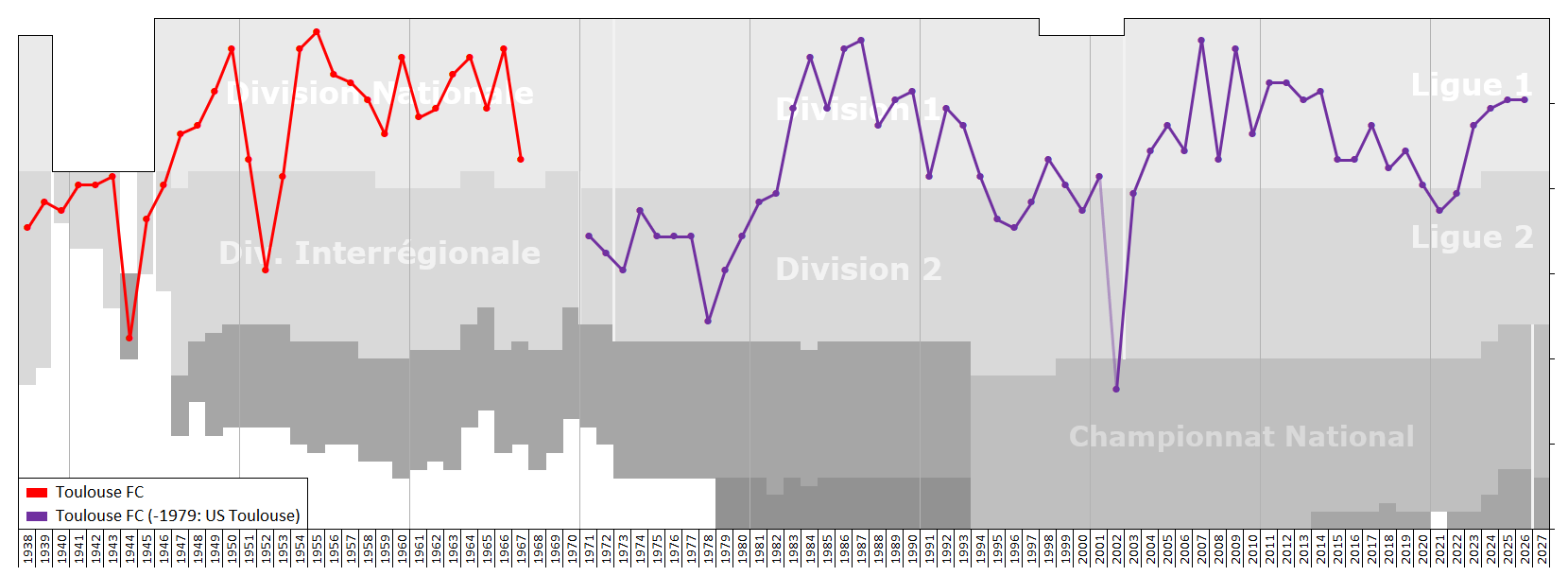
Historical league performance chart of the two Toulouse FCs

== Name changes ==
- Union Sportive Toulouse (1970–79)
- Toulouse Football Club (1979–current)

== Stadium ==
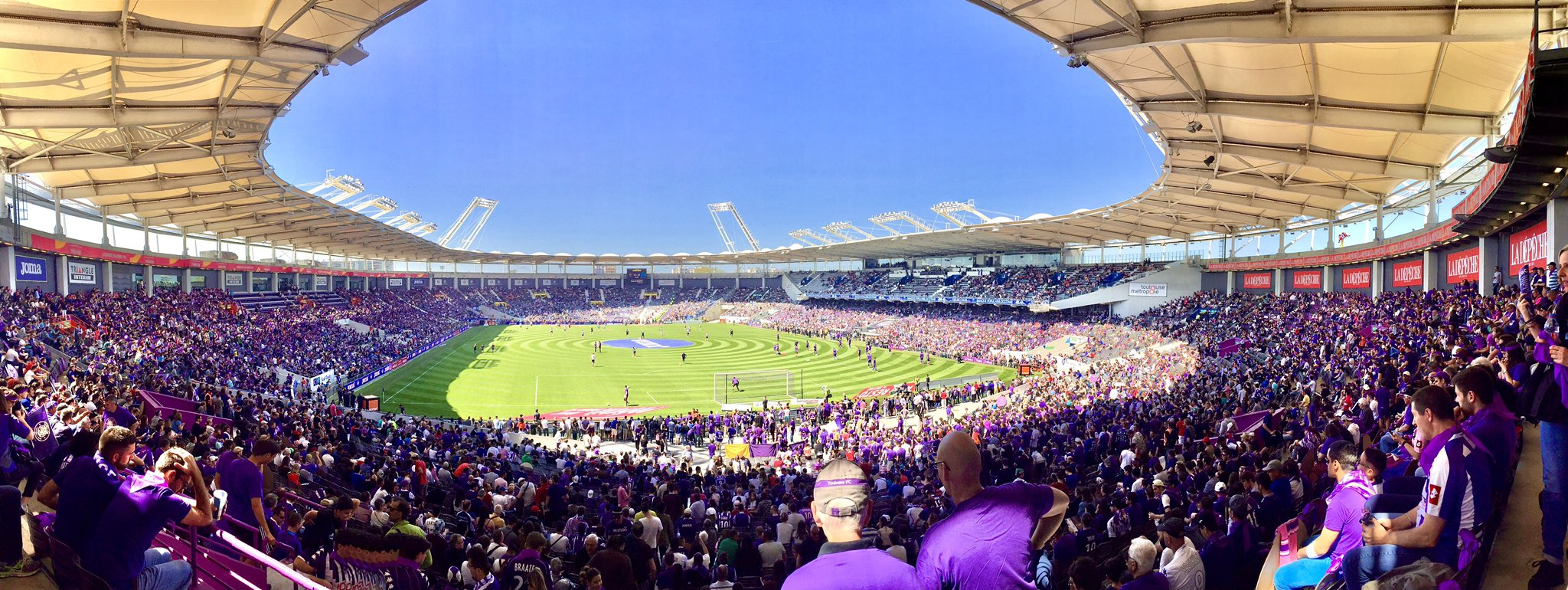
Stadium de Toulouse

Toulouse play their home matches at the Stadium de Toulouse. Built in 1937, the stadium presently has a capacity of 33,150. The stadium saw further renovation and expansion works in 1949, 1998 and 2016.

The stadium was used as a venue for the 1998 FIFA World Cup, 2007 Rugby Union World Cup and UEFA Euro 2016.

== Colours ==
The club's use of violet is a reference to one of two Toulouse nicknames: la Cité des violettes (the City of Violets), the second one being la Ville rose (the Pink City), which explains the colour of former alternate jerseys. The team's logo displays the gold and blood-red Occitan cross, the symbol of Occitania, of which Toulouse is a historical capital.

== Club rivalries ==
=== Derby de la Garonne ===
The Derby de la Garonne is a derby match between Bordeaux and Toulouse. The derby derives from the fact that Bordeaux and Toulouse are the two major cities in south-western France, both of which are situated on the Garonne River. The consistency and competitiveness of the rivalry developed following Toulouse's return to Ligue 1 after being administratively relegated to the third tier in 2001. This derby has been on hold since Bordeaux were administratively relegated to the fourth tier in 2024 and further administratively relegated to the sixth tier in 2026.

== Players ==
=== Current squad ===
As of 4 September 2026

Note: Flags indicate national team as defined under FIFA eligibility rules; some limited exceptions apply. Players may hold more than one non-FIFA nationality.

No.	Pos.	Nation	Player
2	DF	DEN	Rasmus Nicolaisen (captain)
5	DF	FRA	Seny Koumbassa
6	MF	FRA	Alexis Vossah
7	FW	ARG	Julián Vignolo
8	MF	DEN	Thomas Jørgensen
9	FW	ARG	Santiago Hidalgo
11	FW	SWE	Sion Oppong
12	DF	CIV	Christ Tapé
13	FW	CAN	Jacen Russell-Rowe
14	MF	CAN	Niko Sigur
15	MF	NOR	Aron Dønnum
16	GK	FRA	Guillaume Restes

No.	Pos.	Nation	Player
17	MF	GHA	Abu Francis
18	MF	FRA	Mathis Amougou (on loan from Strasbourg)
19	DF	GER	David Odogu (on loan from Milan)
20	FW	DEN	Casper Tengstedt
22	DF	ALG	Rafik Messali
23	MF	VEN	Cristian Cásseres
30	GK	COM	Naïme Saïd Mchindra
31	MF	GER	Niklas Schmidt
37	FW	FRA	Ilyas Azizi
49	MF	FRA	Aymen Amaaouch
60	GK	FRA	Mathys Niflore
94	DF	FRA	Ismaïl Diallo

=== Out on loan ===
Note: Flags indicate national team as defined under FIFA eligibility rules; some limited exceptions apply. Players may hold more than one non-FIFA nationality.

No.	Pos.	Nation	Player
—	DF	FRA	Ylies Aradj (at Aubagne Air Bel until 30 June 2027)
—	DF	ENG	Charlie Cresswell (at Rennes until 30 June 2027)
—	DF	FRA	Aymen Sadi (at Aubagne Air Bel until 30 June 2027)

No.	Pos.	Nation	Player
—	MF	FRA	Mathis Saka (at Rodez until 30 June 2027)
—	MF	SVK	Mário Sauer (at Kaiserslautern until 30 June 2027)
—	FW	FRA	Enzo Faty (at Francs Borains until 30 June 2027)

== Honours ==
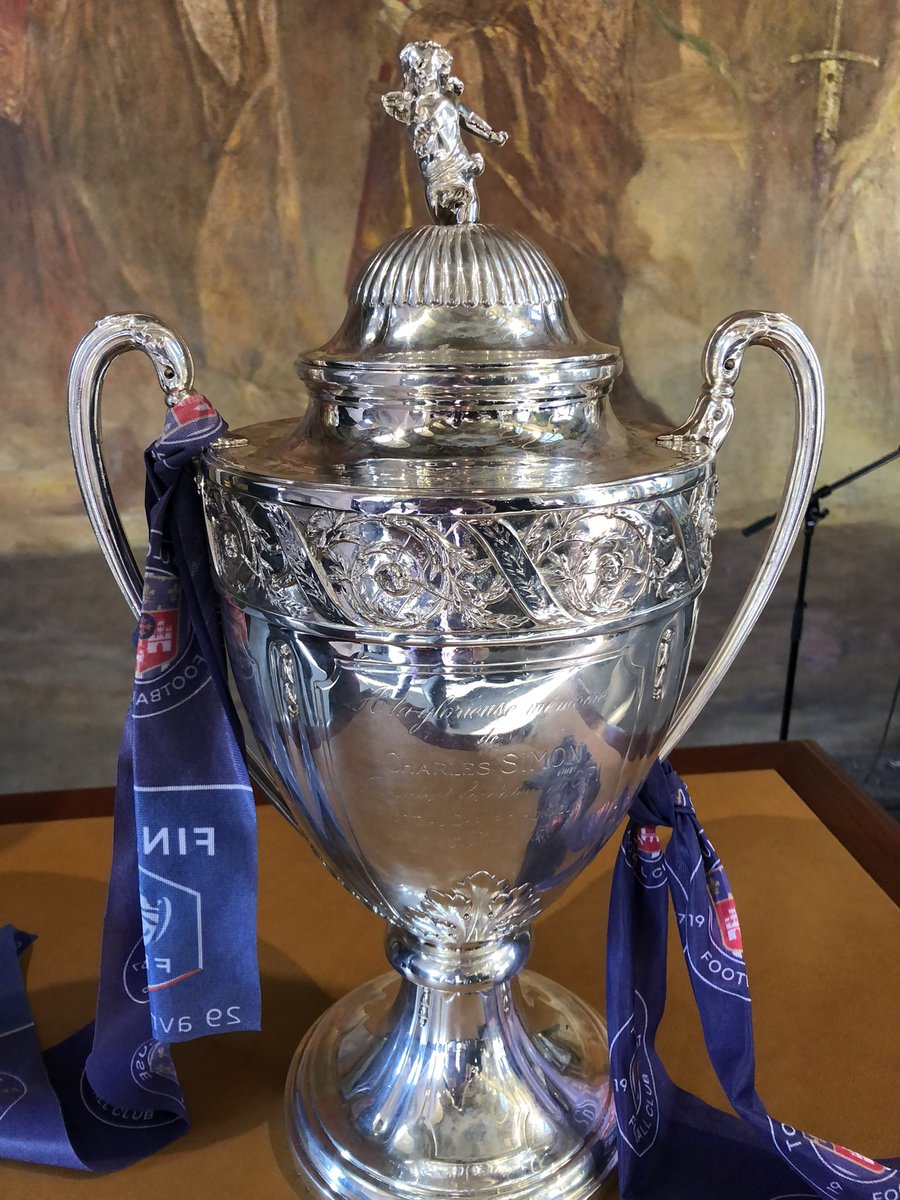
The 2022–23 Coupe de France on display at the Capitole in Toulouse.

As of 11 May 2023.

=== Domestic ===
- Coupe de France
  - Winners (1): 2022–23
- Ligue 2
  - Winners (3): 1981–82, 2002–03, 2021–22

== Toulouse in European football ==
=== Matches ===
Season	Competition	Round	Opponent	Home	Away	Aggregate
1986–87	UEFA Cup	First round	(Italy) Napoli	1–0 (a.e.t.)	0–1	1–1 (4–3 p)
1986–87	UEFA Cup	Second round	(Soviet Union) Spartak Moscow	3–1	1–5	4–6
1987–88	UEFA Cup	First round	(Greece) Panionios	5–1	1–0	6–1
1987–88	UEFA Cup	Second round	(Germany) Bayer Leverkusen	1–1	0–1	1–2
2007–08	UEFA Champions League	Third qualifying round	(England) Liverpool	0–1	0–4	0–5
2007–08	UEFA Cup	Play-off round	(Bulgaria) CSKA Sofia	0–0	1–1	1–1 (a)
2007–08	UEFA Cup	Group E	(Germany) Bayer Leverkusen	—N/a	0–1	5th place
2007–08	UEFA Cup	Group E	(Russia) Spartak Moscow	2–1	—N/a	5th place
2007–08	UEFA Cup	Group E	(Switzerland) Zürich	—N/a	0–2	5th place
2007–08	UEFA Cup	Group E	(Czech Republic) Sparta Prague	2–3	—N/a	5th place
2009–10	UEFA Europa League	Play-off round	(Turkey) Trabzonspor	0–1	3–1	3–2
2009–10	UEFA Europa League	Group J	(Ukraine) Shakhtar Donetsk	0–2	0–4	3rd place
2009–10	UEFA Europa League	Group J	(Belgium) Club Brugge	2–2	0–1	3rd place
2009–10	UEFA Europa League	Group J	(Serbia) Partizan	1–0	3–2	3rd place
2023–24	UEFA Europa League	Group E	(Belgium) Union Saint-Gilloise	0–0	1–1	2nd place
2023–24	UEFA Europa League	Group E	(Austria) LASK	1–0	2–1	2nd place
2023–24	UEFA Europa League	Group E	(England) Liverpool	3–2	1–5	2nd place
2023–24	UEFA Europa League	Knockout round play-offs	(Portugal) Benfica	0–0	1–2	1–2

== Club officials ==
President	Damien Comolli
Association President	José Da Silva
Head Coach	Carles Martínez Novell
Assistant Coach	Pol García; Jordan Galtier; Stéphane Lièvre
Goalkeeper Coach	Éric Allibert
Conditioning Coach	Denis Valour
Conditioning Coach	Guillaume Ravé
Conditioning Coach	Clément Hazard
Youth Coach	Jean-Baptiste Winckler
Chief Analyst	Julien Demeaux
Club Doctor	Patrick Flamant
Physiotherapist	Sébastien Cirilo
Physiotherapist	Boris Cohen
Masseur	Florent Parquin
Kit Manager	Jacqui Teulieres
Academy Director	Rémy Loret

Source: LFP.fr

== Managers ==
- (Argentina) José Farías (1970–72)
- (France) Richard Boucher (1973–74, 1974–75, 1976–77)
- (Argentina) Ángel Marcos (1977–78)
- (France) Just Fontaine (1978–79)
- (France) Pierre Cahuzac (1979–83)
- (Switzerland) Daniel Jeandupeux (1 July 1983 – 30 June 1985)
- (France) Jacques Santini (1 July 1985 – 30 June 1989)
- (France) Pierre Mosca (1 July 1989 – 30 June 1991)
- (France) Victor Zvunka (1 July 1991 – 1 September 1992)
- (France) Serge Delmas (1 July 1992 – 14 January 1994)
- (France) Jean-Luc Ruty (14 January 1994 – 30 June 1994)
- (France) Rolland Courbis (1 July 1994 – 1 November 1995)
- (France) Alain Giresse (1 November 1995 – 30 June 1998)
- (France) Guy Lacombe (1 July 1998 – 25 January 1999)
- (France) Alain Giresse (26 January 1999 – 9 October 2000)
- (France) Robert Nouzaret (1 October 2000 – 30 June 2001)
- (France) Erick Mombaerts (1 July 2001 – 30 June 2006)
- (France) Elie Baup (1 July 2006 – 30 May 2008)
- (France) Alain Casanova (30 May 2008 – 16 March 2015)
- (France) Dominique Arribagé (16 March 2015 – 2 March 2016)
- (France) Pascal Dupraz (2 March 2016 – 22 January 2018)
- (France) Mickaël Debève (23 January 2018 – 14 June 2018)
- (France) Alain Casanova (22 June 2018 – 10 October 2019)
- (New Caledonia) Antoine Kombouaré (14 October 2019 – 6 January 2020)
- (France) Denis Zanko (5 January 2020 – 22 June 2020)
- (France) Patrice Garande (22 June 2020 – 2 June 2021)
- (France) Philippe Montanier (23 June 2021 – 14 June 2023)
- (Spain) Carles Martínez Novell (15 June 2023 – 30 June 2026)
- (Denmark) Jens Berthel Askou (1 July 2026 – present)

== See also ==
- Toulouse FC (women)
