= Aïmane El Gueribi =

French footballer (born 1982)

Personal information
- Full name: Aïmane El Gueribi
- Date of birth: 16 January 1982 (age 44)
- Place of birth: Niort, France
- Height: 1.75 m (5 ft 9 in)
- Position: Midfielder

Team information
- Current team: Thouars

Youth career
- 2001–2003: Chamois Niortais

Senior career*
Years	Team	Apps	(Gls)
2003–2005	Chamois Niortais	19	(1)
2005–2007	Avion	?	(?)
2007–2008	Les Herbiers	?	(?)
2008–	Thouars	?	(?)
- * Club domestic league appearances and goals as of 11:27, 27 November 2009 (UTC)

Aïmane El Gueribi (born 16 January 1982) is a French semi-professional footballer who currently plays for Championnat de France amateur 2 side Thouars Foot 79. He plays as a midfielder. He played 19 matches in Ligue 2 for Chamois Niortais between 2003 and 2005.
