= Benoît Maurice =

French footballer (born 1971)

Personal information
- Full name: Benoît Maurice
- Date of birth: September 16, 1971 (age 55)
- Place of birth: Toulon, France
- Height: 1.89 m (6 ft 2 1/2 in)
- Position: Defender

Senior career*
Years	Team	Apps	(Gls)
1990–1998	Laval	197	(9)
1998–2000	Amiens	76	(4)
2000–2001	Clermont Foot	36	(1)
2001–2003	Chamois Niortais	12	(0)
- * Club domestic league appearances and goals

Benoît Maurice (born September 16, 1971) is a retired professional footballer. He played as a central defender.
