= Piton (surname) =

Piton is a French surname that may refer to the following notable people:

- Alexandre Piton (born 1972), French ice dancer
- Barbara Piton (born 1977), French ice dancer, sister of Alexandre
- Bertrand Piton (born 1970), French football defender
- Halina Pitoń (born 1972), Polish biathlete
- John Piton (1865–1942), South African first-class cricketer
- Lucas Piton (born 2000), Brazilian football player
- Phil Piton (1903–1983), American baseball executive
- Pierre de Piton, 16th century French colonel
