= Ferdinand Faczinek =

Slovak footballer (1911–1991)

Personal information
- Date of birth: 31 December 1911
- Place of birth: Pozsony, Austria-Hungary
- Date of death: 1991 (aged 79–80)
- Position: Striker

Senior career*
Years	Team	Apps	(Gls)
1933–1937	Sparta Prague	69	(44)
1937–1939	Sochaux		
1939	CA Paris		
1939–1940	Niort		
1940–1943	FC Sète		
1943–1948	Niort		

International career
1934–1937	Czechoslovakia	8	(0)

Managerial career
- 1943–1948: Niort
- 1957–1958: Strasbourg
- 1959–1960: US Forbach
- * Club domestic league appearances and goals

Ferdinand Faczinek (31 December 1911 – 1991) was a Slovak footballer who played for the Czechoslovakia national football team (8 caps).

Winner of the Central European Cup in 1935, the most prestigious cup competition of interwar Europe. He played a total of 24 matches in the Central European Cup and scored 14 goals.

Ferdinand Faczinek played 69 matches in the top Czechoslovak league, in which he scored 44 goals.
