= Henri Burda =

Polish footballer (1926–1965)

Personal information
- Date of birth: 4 January 1926
- Place of birth: Chwalibogowo, Poland
- Height: 1.75 m (5 ft 9 in)
- Position: Defender

Senior career*
Years	Team	Apps	(Gls)
1948–1957	Metz	246	(33)
1957–1958	Limoges FC	31	(6)

Managerial career
- 1960–1963: Niort
- 1963–1965: Châteauroux
- * Club domestic league appearances and goals

Henri Burda (4 January 1926 – 29 October 1965) was a French-Polish association football player and manager. He played in France for Metz and Limoges FC, and later coached Niort and Châteauroux.

== Managerial statistics ==
Team	From	Until	Record				
Team	From	Until	G	W	L	D	Win %
Niort	1960	1963	72	35	15	22	48.61
Châteauroux	1963	1965	46	25	12	9	54.35
