= Stéphane Robinet =

Former French footballer (born 1983)

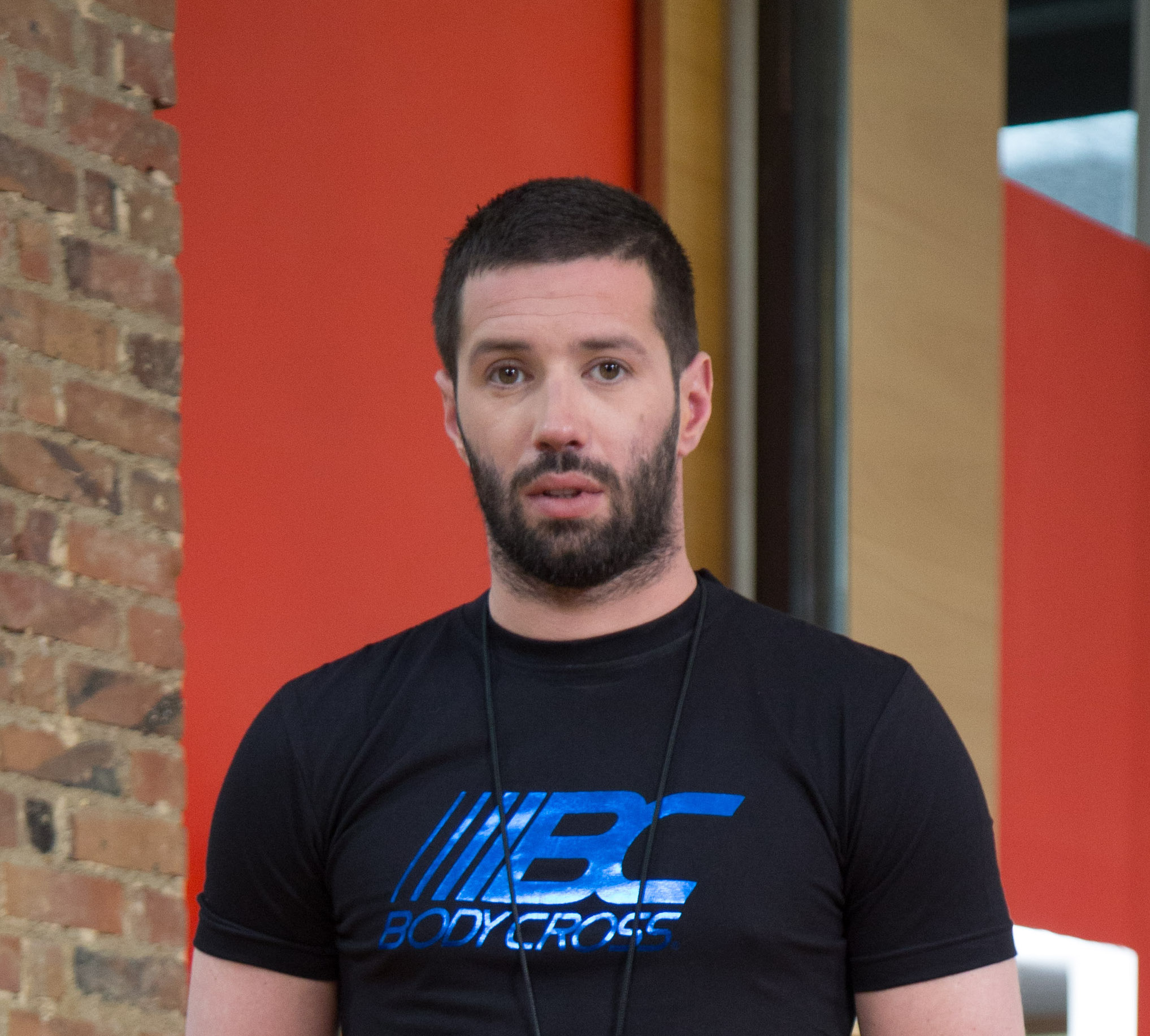
- Stéphane Robinet in 2013

Personal information
- Full name: Stéphane Robinet
- Date of birth: May 2, 1983 (age 43)
- Place of birth: Paris, France
- Height: 1.81 m (5 ft 11 1/2 in)
- Position: Striker

Senior career*
Years	Team	Apps	(Gls)
2001–2005	Chamois Niortais	53	(5)
2005–2006	Raon-l'Étape	13	(2)
2006–2008	Cherbourg	51	(3)
2009–2010	Paris FC	5	(0)
2010–2012	FC Versailles	0	(0)
Total		122	(10)
- * Club domestic league appearances and goals as of 21:41, 19 May 2023 (UTC)

Stéphane Robinet (French pronunciation: [stefˈan ʁobinˈɛ]; born 2 May 1983) is a former footballer playing for Championnat National side Paris FC as a striker. He retired from football in July 2012.
