= Christophe Ott =

French footballer (born 1983)

Personal information
- Full name: Christophe Ott
- Date of birth: 7 April 1983 (age 43)
- Place of birth: Luxeuil-les-Bains, France
- Height: 1.85 m (6 ft 1 in)
- Position: Goalkeeper

Team information
- Current team: EA Guingamp (assistant)

Senior career*
Years	Team	Apps	(Gls)
2004–2007	Chamois Niortais	35	(0)
2007–2008	Pau	10	(0)
2008	Ionikos FC	0	(0)
2008–2009	APEP Pitsilia	3	(0)
2009–2010	FC Martigues	16	(0)
2010–2011	Versailles	?	(?)
2011–2013	Poissy	9	(0)

Managerial career
- 2019–: EA Guingamp (assistant)
- * Club domestic league appearances and goals

Christophe Ott (born 7 April 1983 in Luxeuil-les-Bains) is a retired French footballer who played as a goalkeeper. He is currently the assistant manager of EA Guingamp.

== Career ==
A product of Niort's youth football teams, Ott became a professional with the senior side, and made two appearances in the French Ligue 2. (Note: Christophe Ott – French league stats at LFP – also available in French (archived))

In 2010, Ott went on a week-long trial with English League One club Yeovil Town.

== Coaching career ==
From June 2012 to June 2014, Ott worked as a youth coach for AS Poissy's U12 squad and later as a youth goalkeeper coach for Athletic Club de Boulogne-Billancourt from June 2015 to June 2016.

He then accepted to helping Patrice Lair, coaching the goalkeepers of Paris Saint-Germain Féminine. Ott also became a goalkeeping coach, and was appointed assistant to Niort's manager Patrice Lair in July 2018.

Ott followed Patrice Lair to EA Guingamp, acting as his assistant coach this time and not just goalkeeper coach. However, Lair was fired on 23 September 2019 but Ott stayed at the club as assistant manager of the caretaker manager Sylvain Didot, who later was given the job officially.

== Honours ==
Chamois Niortais

- Championnat National champions: 2005–06
