= Thomas Debenest =

French footballer (born 1973)

Personal information
- Full name: Thomas Jean-Marie Debenest
- Date of birth: 4 August 1973 (age 53)
- Place of birth: Niort, France
- Height: 1.83 m (6 ft 0 in)
- Position: Goalkeeper

Senior career*
Years	Team	Apps	(Gls)
1991–1997	Chamois Niortais	102	(0)
1996–1997	→ Red Star (loan)	36	(0)
1997–1998	Angers	25	(0)
1998–2000	Mouscron	8	(0)
2000–2002	Maia	50	(0)
2002–2005	Beira-Mar	16	(0)
2005–2006	Moissy-Cramayel	33	(0)
Total		270	(0)
- * Club domestic league appearances and goals

Thomas Jean-Marie Debenest (born 4 August 1973) is a French former professional footballer who played as a goalkeeper.
