= Mathieu Texier =

French footballer (born 1981)

Personal information
- Full name: Mathieu Texier
- Date of birth: 1 February 1981 (age 45)
- Place of birth: Niort, France
- Height: 1.80 m (5 ft 11 in)
- Position: Defensive midfielder

Team information
- Current team: Luzenac
- Number: 3

Senior career*
| Years | Team | Apps | (Gls) |
| 2001–2004 | Chamois Niortais | 17 | (0) |
| 2005–2006 | Delémont | 26 | (5) |
| 2006–2008 | Aurillac | 61 | (0) |
| 2008– | Luzenac | 54 | (2) |
- * Club domestic league appearances and goals as of 10:10, 13 June 2010 (UTC)

Mathieu Texier (born February 1, 1981) is a footballer, currently playing for Championnat National side US Luzenac as a defensive midfielder.

== See also ==
- Football in France
- List of football clubs in France
