= Ismaïl Diallo =

French footballer (born 2003)

Personal information
- Date of birth: 23 August 2003 (age 23)
- Place of birth: Champigny-sur-Marne, France
- Height: 1.82 m (5 ft 11 1/2 in)
- Position: Full-back

Team information
- Current team: Toulouse
- Number: 94

Youth career
- CFFP
- Paris FC

Senior career*
Years	Team	Apps	(Gls)
- Nanterre
–2024	Paris 13 Atletico	25	(1)
2024–2026	Dijon	45	(3)
2026–	Toulouse	4	(0)
- * Club domestic league appearances and goals as of 12 September 2026

Ismaïl Diallo (born 23 August 2003) is a French professional footballer who plays as a full-back for Ligue 1 club Toulouse.

== Early life ==
Diallo was born on 23 August 2008. Born in Champigny-sur-Marne, France, he is of Senegalese descent through his parents.

== Club career ==
Diallo began playing football in Fontenay-sous-Bois at the age of six, and later trained at the CFFP and in the youth ranks of Paris FC. He then played for Nanterre before joining Paris 13 Atletico, where he moved up from the reserve team to the first team. In the 2023–24 season, he played 25 matches in the Championnat National 2 as the club won promotion to the Championnat National.

In June 2024, Diallo agreed to join Dijon on a two-year deal, his first professional contract. In 2025–26, he made 24 appearances and scored three goals as Dijon won the National title and promotion to Ligue 2.

On 22 May 2026, Ligue 1 club Toulouse announced the signing of Diallo, who was at the end of his contract with Dijon. He made his debut on 22 August in a 2–0 home defeat to Lyon.

== Honours ==
Dijon

- Championnat National: 2025–26
