= Philippe Souchard =

French footballer (born 1979)

Personal information
- Full name: Philippe Souchard
- Date of birth: 23 December 1979 (age 46)
- Place of birth: Niort, France
- Height: 1.80 m (5 ft 11 in)
- Position: Defender

Team information
- Current team: Niort Saint-Florent

Senior career*
Years	Team	Apps	(Gls)
2000–2003	Chamois Niortais		(1)
2003–2006	Romorantin	82	(2)
2006–2007	Raon-l'Étape	32	(4)
2007–2008	Angoulême	?	(?)
2008–	Niort Saint-Florent	?	(?)
- * Club domestic league appearances and goals

Philippe Souchard (born 23 December 1979) is a French footballer, currently playing for French non-league team Niort Saint-Florent as a defender. He previously played 27 matches in Ligue 2 with Chamois Niortais.

== See also ==
- Football in France
- List of football clubs in France
