= Jean-Claude Casties =

French footballer and manager (born 1936)

Personal information
- Full name: Jean-Claude Casties
- Date of birth: November 11, 1936 (age 89)
- Place of birth: Bordeaux, France
- Height: 1.79 m (5 ft 10 in)
- Position: Defender

Senior career*
Years	Team	Apps	(Gls)
1956–1963	Bordeaux		
1963–1965	Cannes		
1965–1967	Ajaccio		

Managerial career
- 1967–1969: Niort
- 1970–1973: La Roche-sur-Yon
- 1972–1976: Libourne
- 1986–1987: La Roche-sur-Yon
- * Club domestic league appearances and goals

Jean-Claude Casties (born November 11, 1936) is a French former professional footballer and manager.
