= Kazimir Hnatow =

French footballer (1929–2010)

Personal information
- Date of birth: 9 November 1929
- Place of birth: Crusnes, France
- Date of death: 16 December 2010 (aged 81)
- Place of death: Vouillé, France
- Position: Midfielder

Senior career*
| Years | Team | Apps | (Gls) |
| 1951–1953 | Metz | 56 | (10) |
| 1953–1956 | Stade Français | 90 | (22) |
| 1956–1963 | Angers | 243 | (19) |
| 1963–1966 | Niort | | |

International career
| 1958 | France | 0 | (0) |

Managerial career
- 1963–1966: Niort
- 1972–1973: Niort
Medal record
Representing France
FIFA World Cup
| Third place | 1958 Sweden |
- * Club domestic league appearances and goals

Kazimir (or Casimir) Hnatow (9 November 1929 – 16 December 2010) was a French football player and manager.

== Club career ==
A midfielder, Hnatow began his career at Metz in 1951, where he spent two seasons, making 56 appearances and scoring ten goals. In 1953, he joined Stade Français. He spent three seasons at the Parisian club, making 29 appearances and scoring nine goals. He then joined Angers in 1956, and in the following year, he was a runner-up in the Coupe de France final, losing 6–3 to Toulouse. He made 243 appearances and scored 19 goals for the Pays de la Loire-based team. He then ended his career in a player-coach role at Chamois Niortais.

== International career ==
Hnatow was part of the French squad which finished third at the 1958 FIFA World Cup, but he never won a cap for the France national team.

== Managerial career ==
Hnatow managed amateur side Chamois Niortais in two separate spells; the first as a player-coach from 1963 to 1966, and the second alongside Robert Charrier during the 1972–73 Championnat de France amateur Division 3 season. He is one of three coaches to manage the club on two occasions, the other two being Charrier and Pascal Gastien.

== Personal life ==
Hnatow was of Ukrainian descent.
