= Naïme Saïd Mchindra =

Footballer (born 2001)

Personal information
- Full name: Naïme Ben Zayer Saïd Mchindra
- Date of birth: 28 May 2005 (age 21)
- Place of birth: Mamoudzou, Mayotte, France
- Height: 1.85 m (6 ft 1 in)
- Position: Goalkeeper

Team information
- Current team: Toulouse

Youth career
- L'Union Saint-Jean
- 2019-2022: Toulouse

Senior career*
Years	Team	Apps	(Gls)
2022–	Toulouse II	17	(0)
2025–	Toulouse	0	(0)

International career^{‡}
2024	Comoros U20	2	(0)
2025–	Comoros	5	(0)
- * Club domestic league appearances and goals as of 19 May 2026 ‡ National team caps and goals as of 18:26, 3 September 2025 (UTC)

Naïme Ben Zayer Saïd Mchindra (born 28 May 2005) is a professional footballer who plays as a goalkeeper for the Ligue 1 club Toulouse. Born in Mayotte, he plays for the Comoros national team.

== Club career ==
A youth product of L'Union Saint-Jean, Saïd Mchindra joined the academy of Toulouse as a U14. He was promoted to their reserves in 2022. On 11 March 2025, he was named to the matchday squad as third goalkeeper for a Ligue 1 match against Reims. On 19 June 2025, he signed his first professional contract with Toulouse until 2025 until 2028.

== International career ==
A former youth international for Comoros, Saïd Mchindra was called up to the Comoros national team for the 2025 COSAFA Cup.
