= Cheick Sidia Baldé =

Guinean footballer

Cheick Baldé
Personal information
- Full name: Cheick Sidia Baldé
- Date of birth: 1 January 1983 (age 43)
- Place of birth: Conakry, Guinea
- Height: 1.83 m (6 ft 0 in)
- Position: Defensive midfielder

Youth career
- –2002: Desportivo de Cuntum FC

Senior career*
Years	Team	Apps	(Gls)
2002–2004	Chamois Niortais	4	(0)
2004–2005	Orléans	13	(1)
2005–2011	Balma	108	(17)
2006–2007	→ Aviron Bayonnais (loan)	20	(1)
2011–2014	Toulouse Rodéo FC		
- * Club domestic league appearances and goals

Cheick Sidia Baldé (born 1 January 1983) is a Guinean former professional footballer who played as a defensive midfielder. He spent all of his career in France, mostly with Balma SC.

== Career ==
Baldé was born in Conakry, Guinea. He started his professional career in France with Chamois Niortais, during his career here played four matches in Ligue 2 in the 2003–04 season. In summer 2004 he left Chamois Niortais and joined Championnat de France amateur Group D club US Orléans where he played 13 matches in the 2005–06 CFA season.

Baldé left Orléans after of the season to sign for Balma SC. He played in his first CFA Group C season 14 games and scored two goals, before he joined Ligue rival Aviron Bayonnais FC on loan. He scored one goal for the club in 20 matches and returned in May 2007 to Balma. After his return was one of the leaders of Balma SC and played 84 matches, in which scored 15 goals.

On 29 June 2011, he left Balma and signed with Toulouse Rodéo FC.
