= Fabien Safanjon =

French footballer (born 1972)

Personal information
- Full name: Fabien Safanjon
- Date of birth: 31 October 1972 (age 53)
- Place of birth: Feurs, France
- Height: 1.87 m (6 ft 1 1/2 in)
- Position: Defender

Senior career*
Years	Team	Apps	(Gls)
1989–1999	Gueugnon	235	(6)
1999–2004	Chamois Niortais	108	(4)
2004–2005	Rouen	8	(0)
- * Club domestic league appearances and goals

Fabien Safanjon (born 31 October 1972) is a former professional footballer who played as a defender. He joined Gueugnon in 1989, remaining with the club for over a decade and making more than 230 appearances before moving to Chamois Niortais. After five years and having made over 100 appearances for them, Safanjon moved to Rouen where he spent the final year of his playing career, finishing in 2005.
