= I Made Sidia =

Balinese puppeteer

I Made Sidia is a Balinese wayang puppeteer. He is one of Bali's most acclaimed shadow artists.

Graduated in 1992 with a degree in Balinese theatre (Pedalangan) from the Indonesian State College of Arts (STSI) Denpasar Bali Performance and Script: Sumbah (a taleform Mahabharata. Since 1993 has been a faculty member at the Arts Institute Denpasar, Bali, Indonesia. In 2000 he became director of Paripurna Art Company, Bona, Gianyar and in 2002 director of production of the Theatre Dept. Arts Institute Denpasar.

Has worked with hundreds of school students from around the globe, teaching the Wayang Kulit and the Kecak. He recently worked with the Year 9 drama students of John Curtin College of the Arts, teaching wayang puppetry, kayonan dances, Kecak dance and traditional makeup and costuming. After only seven weeks on irregular practice, the students performed Made's choreography.

== Credits ==
- Bali Arts Festival – director of opening ceremony 2008, choreographer for Gong Kebyar Competition
- Moksa – artistic director of a spectacular production which was presented for the 10th Anniversary of Gunarsa Fine Arts Museum on January 16, 2004, by the Indonesian Arts Institute Denpasar.
- The Theft Of Sita – international multi media production, first performed at the Adelaide Festival in 2000 and world tour to United States, Europe, Asia and Australia.
- Hari Kesahatan – performance for World Environment Day in 2008 in Jakarta
- Diburu Waktu – Theatre and multi-media performance, AT 2005 Darwin Festival in collaboration with Australian artistic director, Andrish Saint Clare, written by Sandra Thibodeaux.
- Cross Cultural performance at Angkor Wat, Cambodia, 2005 in collaboration with Kambojia performer Mankosal and artistic director Delpin, sponsored by Kelola
- Invited to perform and give workshops at UNIMA in Perth in 2008.

== Awards ==
1978 as the second winner of Bali Children Puppeteer Competition 2003 my company became the first winner in the 2003 All-Bali Children Gong Kebyar Competition (the VCD enclosed).
