= Jocelyn Ducloux =

French footballer (born 1974)

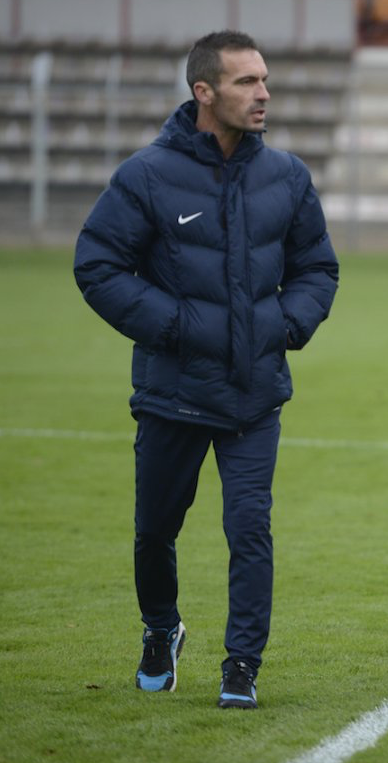

Personal information
- Full name: Jocelyn Ducloux
- Date of birth: 22 August 1974 (age 52)
- Place of birth: Le Creusot, France
- Height: 1.80 m (5 ft 11 in)
- Position: Midfielder

Team information
- Current team: Montceau

Senior career*
Years	Team	Apps	(Gls)
1992–2001	Louhans-Cuiseaux	168	(2)
2001–2005	Chamois Niortais	76	(2)
2005–	Montceau	78	(1)
- * Club domestic league appearances and goals as of 18:57, 25 July 2009 (UTC)

Jocelyn Ducloux (born 22 August 1974) is a footballer currently playing for Championnat de France amateur side FC Montceau Bourgogne. He plays as a defensive midfielder.

Before joining Montceau, Ducloux spent nine seasons with Louhans-Cuiseaux, four of which were in Division 2 (now called Ligue 2), and four seasons, all of which in Ligue 2, for Niort.
