= Olivier Brochard =

French footballer (born 1967)

Personal information
- Full name: Olivier Brochard
- Date of birth: February 2, 1967 (age 59)
- Place of birth: Charleville-Mézières, France
- Height: 1.77 m (5 ft 9 1/2 in)
- Position: Defender

Senior career*
Years	Team	Apps	(Gls)
1983–1984	Sedan	0	(0)
1984–1989	Amiens	47	(2)
1989–1990	Abbeville	31	(0)
1990–1997	Chamois Niortais	185	(1)
1997–1999	Tours	50	(1)

Managerial career
- 2007–2008: Saint-Quentin
- * Club domestic league appearances and goals

Olivier Brochard (born February 2, 1967) is a former professional footballer. He played as a defender. He was the manager of Olympique Saint-Quentin in the 2007–08 season, but left after the club was relegated from the Championnat de France amateur 2.
