= Georges Hatz =

French footballer and manager (1917-2007)

Personal information
- Full name: Georges Hatz
- Date of birth: 11 May 1917
- Place of birth: Montgeron, France
- Date of death: 12 May 2007 (aged 90)
- Place of death: Rochefort, France
- Position: Goalkeeper

Senior career*
Years	Team	Apps	(Gls)
1936–1943	Red Star	0	(0)
1943–1944	Paris-Capitale		
1944	Rouen-Normandie		
1944–1945	Red Star	0	(0)
1945–1946	Lille	21	(0)
1946–1947	Rennes	21	(0)
1947–1948	Stade Français		
1948–1950	Red Star	28	(0)

Managerial career
- 1950–1952: Auxerre
- 1953–1955: Niort
- * Club domestic league appearances and goals

Georges Hatz (11 May 1917 – 12 May 2007) was a French football player and manager. He played as a goalkeeper and was part of the Lille OSC side that won the Division 1 and Coupe de France double in 1946.
