= Stéphane Biakolo =

Cameroonian footballer (born 1982)

Personal information
- Date of birth: 8 March 1982 (age 44)
- Place of birth: Echirolles, France
- Height: 1.85 m (6 ft 1 in)
- Position: Forward

Youth career
- Albi

Senior career*
Years	Team	Apps	(Gls)
1998–1999	Montpellier B	1	(1)
1999–2000	Montpellier	0	(0)
2000–2002	Inter Milan	0	(0)
2001–2002	→ Charleroi (loan)	12	(1)
2002–2005	Chamois Niortais	70	(17)
2005–2006	Le Havre	11	(0)
2006–2007	Angers	26	(1)
2007–2008	Laval	5	(1)
2008	Albi	15	(3)
2008–2012	Martigues	98	(31)
2012–2013	US Possession		
2013–2015	JS Saint-Pierroise		
2015–2017	RC Saint-Benoît		
2017	SS Saint-Louisienne		
- * Club domestic league appearances and goals

Stéphane Biakolo (born 8 March 1982) is a French former professional footballer who played as a forward.

== Career ==
In 2000, at the age of 18, Biakolo joined Serie A side Inter from Ligue 1 club Montpellier without having made a first team appearance for the latter. A year later, he joined Sporting Charleroi of Belgium on a season-long loan.

He then returned to France playing in the Ligue 2 for Chamois Niortais and Le Havre AC. Following stints in the third tier with Angers SCO and Stade Lavallois he returned to youth club US Albi in 2008.

After leaving FC Martigues, Biakolo went on play for Réunion clubs US Possession, JS Saint-Pierroise, and RC Saint-Benoît.

Having spent the 2017 season at SS Saint-Louisienne, he left the club.
