= Mohamed Chakouri =

Algerian footballer (born 1986)

Personal information
- Full name: Mohamed Chakouri
- Date of birth: 21 May 1986 (age 40)
- Place of birth: Arles, France
- Height: 1.81 m (5 ft 11 1/2 in)
- Position: Defender

Youth career
- 1994–1996: Mas-Thibert
- 1996–1997: St. Martiners
- 1997–1998: Arles
- 1998–2004: Montpellier

Senior career*
Years	Team	Apps	(Gls)
2004–2008	Montpellier	50	(4)
2008–2011	Charleroi	59	(1)
2011–2012	Arles		
2012–2013	FC Martigues		

International career
	France U19	9	(1)
	France U21	2	(0)
- * Club domestic league appearances and goals as of 1 January 2011

Mohamed Chakouri (Arabic: محمد شاقوري; born 21 May 1986) is a French professional footballer who played as a defender for Charleroi S.C. in the Belgian First Division.

== International career ==
On 17 August 2010 Chakouri was called up to the Algerian national team for a 2012 African Cup of Nations qualifier against Tanzania but did not appear in the match.
