= Yann Dobo =

French professional football player (born 1978)

Personal information
- Date of birth: April 20, 1978 (age 48)
- Place of birth: Vincennes, France
- Height: 1.79 m (5 ft 10 1/2 in)
- Position: Midfielder

Team information
- Current team: L'Entente SSG

Youth career
- 1984–1989: Ecole Pierre et Marie Curie
- 1989–1992: Collége Le Carré Sainte-Honorine

Senior career*
Years	Team	Apps	(Gls)
1995–1997	Monaco B		
1997–1999	Stade Montois	20	(4)
1999–2000	Saint-Étienne	1	(0)
2000–2002	Libourne		
2002–2003	Angers SCO		
2003–2006	US Créteil-Lusitanos	62	(6)
2006–2008	Créteil B		
2008–2009	did not play		
2009–	L'Entente SSG	18	(2)
- * Club domestic league appearances and goals as of 16:48, 24 November 2009 (UTC)

Yann Dobo (born April 20, 1978) is a French professional football player, who currently plays in the Championnat de France amateur for L'Entente SSG.

== Career ==
Dobo played on the professional level in Ligue 2 for US Créteil-Lusitanos. He played for the main squad of AS Saint-Étienne in Coupe de France and Coupe de la Ligue.
