= Joël Bossis =

French footballer (born 1965)

Personal information
- Full name: Joël Bossis
- Date of birth: 20 May 1965 (age 61)
- Place of birth: Saint-André-Treize-Voies, France
- Height: 1.81 m (5 ft 11 in)
- Position: Striker

Senior career*
Years	Team	Apps	(Gls)
1986–1989	La Roche-sur-Yon	51	(8)
1989–1993	Le Mans	123	(34)
1993–1994	Martigues	21	(1)
1994–1996	Châteauroux	81	(26)
1996–2002	Chamois Niortais	205	(51)
Total		481	(120)
- * Club domestic league appearances and goals

Joël Bossis (born 20 May 1965) is a French former professional association footballer who played as a striker.

== Career ==
During his career, Bossis played for five different clubs, making almost 500 league appearances and scoring well over 100 goals. With a total of 51 goals in over 200 league matches for the club, he was Chamois Niortais' top ever goal scorer during their professional period between 1985 and 2009.

== Personal life ==
Joël is the brother of the French former international footballer, Maxime Bossis.
