= Pascal Landais =

French footballer (born 1979)

Personal information
- Full name: Pascal Landais
- Date of birth: June 13, 1979 (age 47)
- Place of birth: La Rochelle, France
- Height: 6 ft 1 in (1.85 m)
- Position: Goalkeeper

Team information
- Current team: Chamois Niortais (entraîneur des gardiens)

Senior career*
| Years | Team | Apps | (Gls) |
| 1998–2003 | Chamois Niortais | 8 | (0) |
| 2003–2004 | Vannes | 24 | (0) |
| 2004–2009 | Thouars | ? | (?) |
| 2009–2012 | Chamois Niortais | 2 | (0) |
- * Club domestic league appearances and goals as of 23:46, 5 March 2011 (UTC)

Pascal Landais (born 13 June 1979) is a retired French football goalkeeper who last played for Chamois Niortais. He started his career with Niort, before leaving to join Vannes OC in 2003. Following a five-year spell with Thouars Foot 79, Landais re-signed for Niort on a free transfer on 15 June 2009.

Landais made eight appearances in Ligue 2 with Niort between 1998 and 2003.
