= Alberto Queiros =

French footballer (born 1978)

Personal information
- Date of birth: 28 April 1978 (age 48)
- Place of birth: Niort, France
- Height: 1.82 m (6 ft 0 in)
- Position: Midfielder

Team information
- Current team: Fontenay

Senior career*
| Years | Team | Apps | (Gls) |
| 1997–2003 | Chamois Niortais | 111 | (8) |
| 2003–2004 | Laval | 13 | (0) |
| 2004–2005 | Créteil | 24 | (3) |
| 2005– | Fontenay | 54 | (3) |
- * Club domestic league appearances and goals

Alberto Queiros (born 28 April 1978) is a footballer, currently playing for Vendée Fontenay Foot as a midfielder.
