= Gonçales Felix =

Brazilian footballer (born 1985)

Personal information
- Full name: Gonçales da Silva Felix
- Date of birth: 3 June 1985 (age 41)
- Place of birth: São João da Barra, Brazil
- Height: 1.67 m (5 ft 5 1/2 in)
- Position: Midfielder

Senior career*
Years	Team	Apps	(Gls)
2003–2005	Chamois Niortais	1	(0)
- * Club domestic league appearances and goals

Gonçales da Silva Felix (born 3 June 1985) is a former professional footballer. He played as a defensive midfielder. He made one Ligue 2 appearance for Niort in the 2004–05 season.
