= Bertrand Piton =

French footballer (born 1970)

Personal information
- Full name: Bertrand Piton
- Date of birth: August 19, 1970 (age 56)
- Place of birth: Besançon, France
- Height: 1.82 m (6 ft 0 in)
- Position: Defender

Senior career*
Years	Team	Apps	(Gls)
1986–1990	Sochaux	1	(0)
1990–1991	Martigues	25	(1)
1991–1992	Red Star	22	(0)
1992–1997	Sochaux	147	(5)
1997–2004	Chamois Niortais	193	(3)
Total		388	(9)
- * Club domestic league appearances and goals

Bertrand Piton (born August 19, 1970) is a French former professional footballer who played as a defender.
