= Jérôme Foulon =

French footballer (born 1971)

Personal information
- Date of birth: 6 February 1971 (age 55)
- Place of birth: Raillencourt-Sainte-Olle, France
- Height: 1.71 m (5 ft 7 in)
- Position: Right-back

Senior career*
Years	Team	Apps	(Gls)
1987–1994	Valenciennes	139	(5)
1994–1995	Lille	21	(0)
1995–2001	Guingamp	138	(1)
2001–2005	Chamois Niortais	124	(1)
2005–2006	Cambrai		
- * Club domestic league appearances and goals

Jérôme Foulon (born 6 February 1971 in Raillencourt-Sainte-Olle, France) is a former professional footballer who played as a right-back. Whilst at Guingamp he won the 1996 UEFA Intertoto Cup.

== Honours ==
Guingamp

- UEFA Intertoto Cup: 1996
