= Christophe Marichez =

French footballer (born 1974)

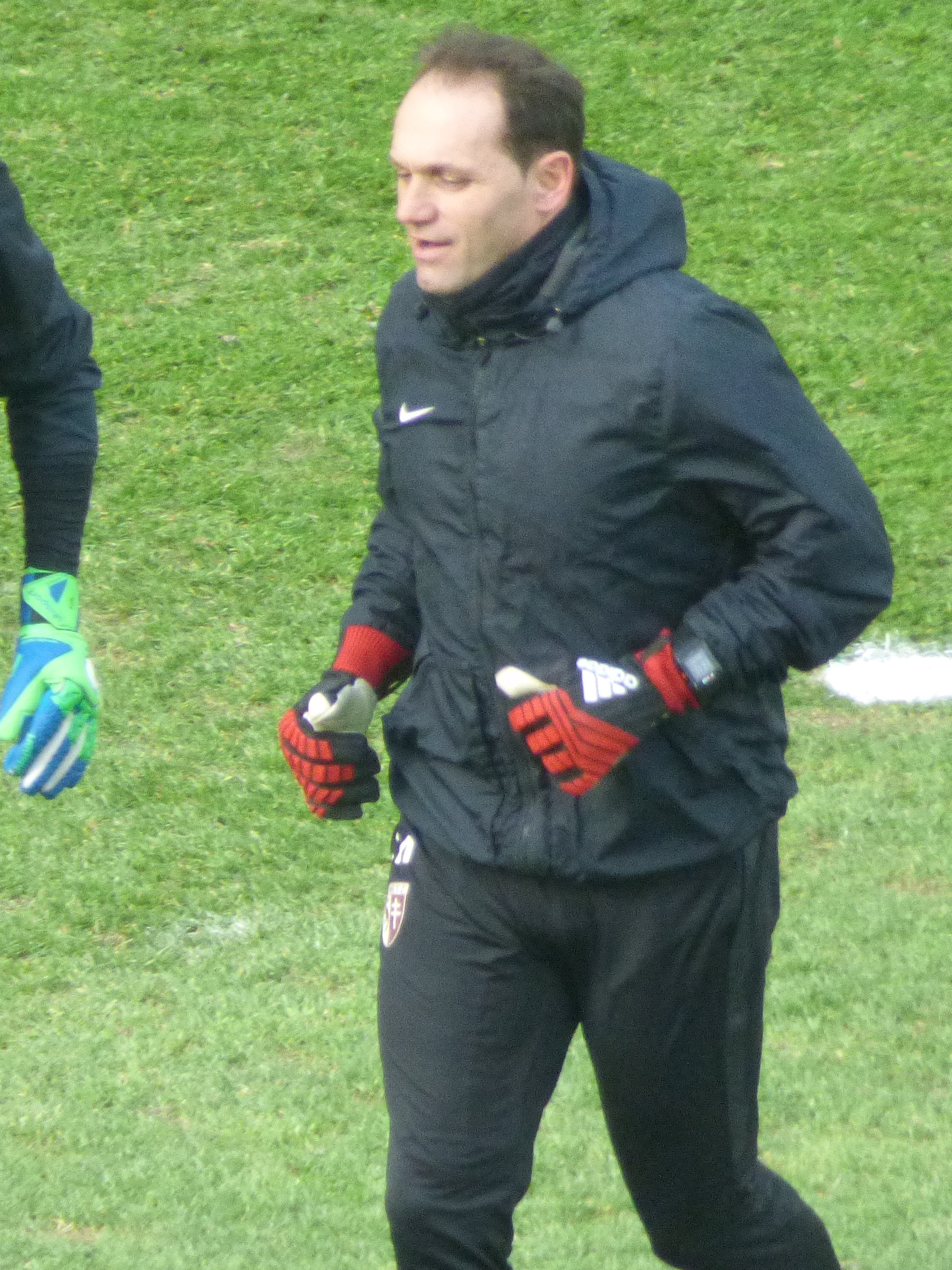
- Marichez in 2019

Personal information
- Full name: Christophe Marichez
- Date of birth: 12 December 1974 (age 51)
- Place of birth: Hazebrouck, France
- Height: 1.82 m (6 ft 0 in)
- Position: Goalkeeper

Youth career
- 1990–1994: Lens

Senior career*
Years	Team	Apps	(Gls)
1994–2000	Lens	6	(0)
2000–2005	Niort	185	(0)
2005–2011	Metz	123	(0)
Total		314	(0)
- * Club domestic league appearances and goals

Christophe Marichez (born 12 December 1974) is a French former footballer who played as a goalkeeper.
