= Richard Boucher (footballer) =

French footballer and coach (1932-2017)

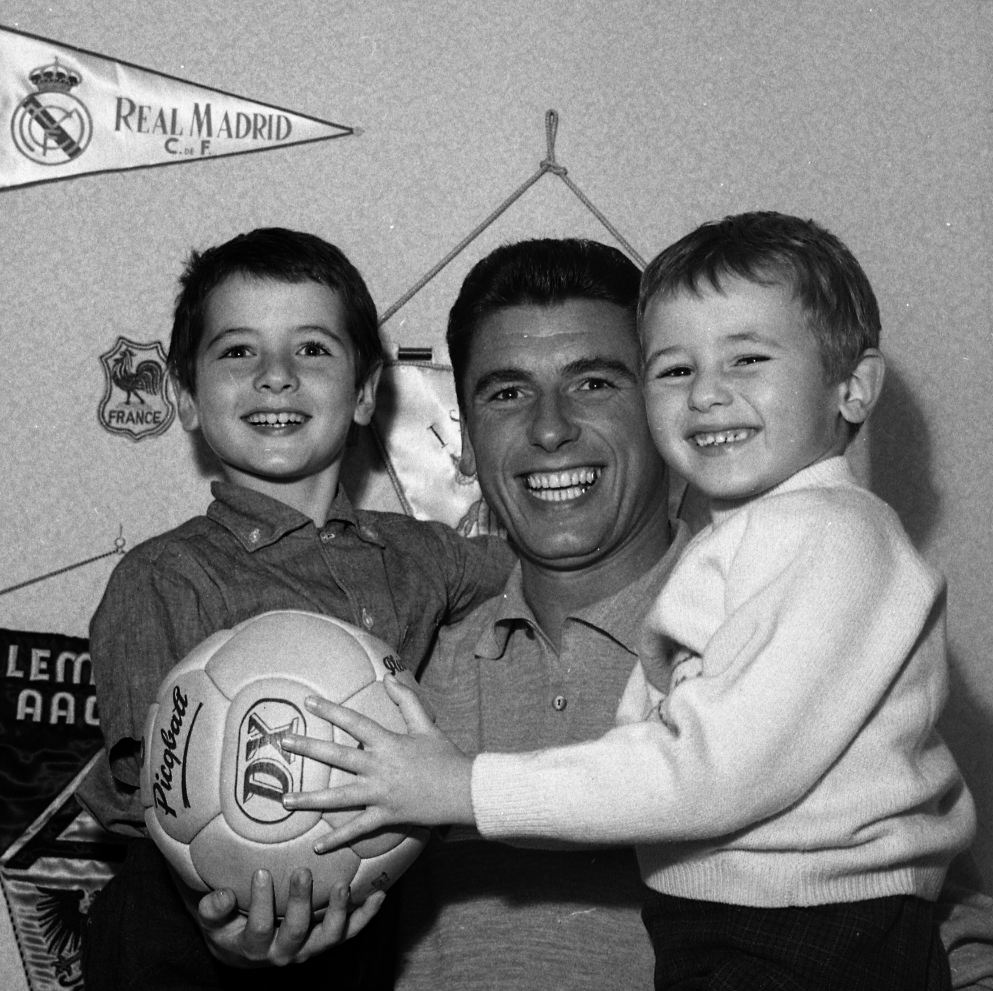

Personal information
- Date of birth: 1 March 1932
- Place of birth: Créteil, France
- Date of death: 26 September 2017 (aged 85)
- Position: Defender

Youth career
- 1946–1947: US Créteil
- 1947–1953: VGA Saint-Maur

Senior career*
Years	Team	Apps	(Gls)
1953–1963	Toulouse		
1963–1964	Marseille	30	(1)
1964–1972	Buzichelli Toulouse		

International career
1957–1961	France	3	(0)

Managerial career
- 1973–1974: Toulouse
- 1974–1975: Toulouse
- 1976–1977: Toulouse
- * Club domestic league appearances and goals

Richard Boucher (1 March 1932 – 26 September 2017) was a French football player and coach with Toulouse FC.
