= Damian Facciuto =

Argentine footballer

Personal information
- Full name: Damian Gonzalo Facciuto
- Date of birth: November 17, 1972 (age 53)
- Place of birth: Buenos Aires, Argentina
- Height: 1.71 m (5 ft 7 1/2 in)
- Position: Midfielder

Senior career*
Years	Team	Apps	(Gls)
1992–1995	Argentinos Juniors	54	(2)
1995–1998	Racing Avellaneda	44	(2)
1997–1998	→ Rosario Central (loan)	28	(3)
1998–2000	Argentinos Juniors	19	(2)
2000–2005	Chamois Niortais	136	(10)
2005–2006	Instituto Cordoba	23	(0)
- * Club domestic league appearances and goals

Damian Gonzalo Facciuto (born November 17, 1972, in Buenos Aires, Argentina) is a former professional footballer. He played as a defensive midfielder.
