= Mickaël Lauret =

French footballer (born 1977)

Personal information
- Full name: Mickaël Lauret
- Date of birth: 15 November 1977 (age 48)
- Place of birth: Châtellerault, France
- Height: 1.76 m (5 ft 9 1/2 in)
- Position: Defender

Senior career*
Years	Team	Apps	(Gls)
1994–2006	Chamois Niortais	158	(0)
- * Club domestic league appearances and goals

Mickaël Lauret (born 15 November 1977) is a retired professional footballer. He played as a defender.
