= Ludovic Mary =

French footballer (born 1977)

Personal information
- Full name: Ludovic Mary
- Date of birth: 7 March 1977 (age 49)
- Place of birth: Suresnes, France
- Height: 1.77 m (5 ft 10 in)
- Position: Left-back

Senior career*
Years	Team	Apps	(Gls)
1994–1999	Nantes	1	(0)
1999–2000	Red Star	28	(1)
2000–2005	Chamois Niortais	119	(3)
2005–2010	Colomiers		

International career
- France U21
- * Club domestic league appearances and goals

Ludovic Mary (born 7 March 1977) is a French former professional footballer who played as a left-back.
