= Samuel Michel =

French footballer and manager (born 1971)

Personal information
- Date of birth: 11 February 1971 (age 55)
- Place of birth: Amiens, France
- Height: 1.77 m (5 ft 10 in)
- Position: Striker

Senior career*
Years	Team	Apps	(Gls)
1989–1994	Red Star	127	(52)
1994–1995	Rennes	17	(2)
1995–1996	Caen	37	(14)
1996–1997	Sochaux	38	(23)
1997	Rennes	2	(0)
1997–1999	Red Star	45	(21)
1999–2001	Guingamp	55	(15)
2001–2005	Chamois Niortais	97	(14)
Total		418	(141)

International career
	France U21	2	(0)

Managerial career
- 2008: Chamois Niortais
- * Club domestic league appearances and goals

Samuel Michel (born 11 February 1971) is a French former professional football player and now manager.

Michel played for a number of Ligue 1 and Ligue 2 clubs during his playing career and was manager of now Championnat de France amateur side Chamois Niortais for a five-month spell in 2008.
