= Franck Azzopardi =

French footballer (born 1970)

Personal information
- Full name: Franck Azzopardi
- Date of birth: 5 December 1970 (age 55)
- Place of birth: Châtellerault, France
- Height: 1.85 m (6 ft 1 in)
- Position: Midfielder

Senior career*
Years	Team	Apps	(Gls)
1989–2005	Chamois Niortais	435	(25)
- * Club domestic league appearances and goals

Franck Azzopardi (born 5 December 1970) is a former professional footballer. He was a defensive midfielder and played his entire career for Chamois Niortais. After retiring from playing, he worked as a coach at his club.
