= Chamois Niortais FC =

French football club

Chamois Niortais
- Full name: Chamois Niortais Football Club
- Nickname: Les chamois (The Chamois)
- Founded: 1925; 101 years ago
- Dissolved: 10 April 2025; 16 months ago
- Ground: Stade René Gaillard
- Capacity: 10,886
- Website: chamoisniortais.org
Home colours	Away colours

Chamois Niortais Football Club (French: Chamois niortais Football Club; French pronunciation: [ʃamwa njɔʁtɛ]; often referred to as Les Chamois, Chamois Niortais, or simply Niort) were a French football club based in the commune of Niort, in the Deux-Sèvres department of Nouvelle-Aquitaine in southwestern France. They were founded in 1925 by Charles Boinot, the son of the owner of a local chamois leather factory. Their home stadium was the Stade René Gaillard in Niort, which has a capacity of 10,898. For most of their existence, Chamois Niortais traditionally played in an entirely blue home kit, although away kits regularly differed.

For the first 20 years of the club's existence they played in local leagues around the Centre-Ouest region. In 1945, after the Second World War, the side joined the Championnat de France Amateur. They achieved promotion to Division 3 in 1970 and stayed in the division for the following eight seasons. From 1980 to 1984, the team played in Division 4 before promotion return to Division 3. The club gained professional status for the first time the following year when they were promoted to Division 2. After another promotion in 1987, they played in Division 1 for the 1987–88 season only, then were relegated next season.

Chamois Niortais were relegated to the Championnat National in 2008, and relegated again the next season, losing their professional status. After finishing as runners-up in the Championnat National, the team were promoted back to Ligue 2 for the 2012–13 season. They were dissolved on 10 April 2025 due to unserviceable debts.

== History ==
=== Early years ===
After the First World War, local chamois leather factory owner, Theophile Boinot, established the first sports club in Niort, Amicale Club Niortais. Soon after, the football section of the club was founded and named Étoile Sportive Niortaise. In 1923, many players were conscripted into the French army. In 1925, a number of the players returned to the town and Boinot's son, Charles, set up the first proper association football team in the town, which he named Chamois Niortais Football Club.

For the first season, the presidency of the club was entrusted to Jean Gavaggio, a chemical engineer at the Boinot factory. Georges Poussard, also a worker in the factory, was appointed as the club's first secretary. The original team played in a fully white strip, and competed in the regional championship of the Ligue de Charentes. In 1929, the Swiss footballer Franchina was named as the club's first manager and the first committee was elected. Throughout the 1930s the club continued to grow in size, enlisting more players and members, despite the team performing relatively poorly in the league.

For the 1932–33 season, Chamois Niortais joined the DH Centre-Ouest, the highest level of regional football in France, and finished eighth in their first season. The side achieved consecutive sixth- and seventh-place finishes in the next two seasons, before being relegated to the Promotion d'Honneur in 1936. The team played in the division for three seasons, until they gained promotion back to the DH Centre-Ouest at the end of the 1938–39 campaign. In 1939, Joseph Boinot was appointed president of the club. The following year the club pulled off a major coup with the signing of Czechoslovakia international Ferdinand Faczinek, who played for the club for one season before transferring to FC Sète at the end of the 1940–41 campaign, after which the Second World War halted competitive football for two years in France. In 1943, the club were one of the founder members of the Championnat de France amateur (CFA), the highest level of amateur football in France.

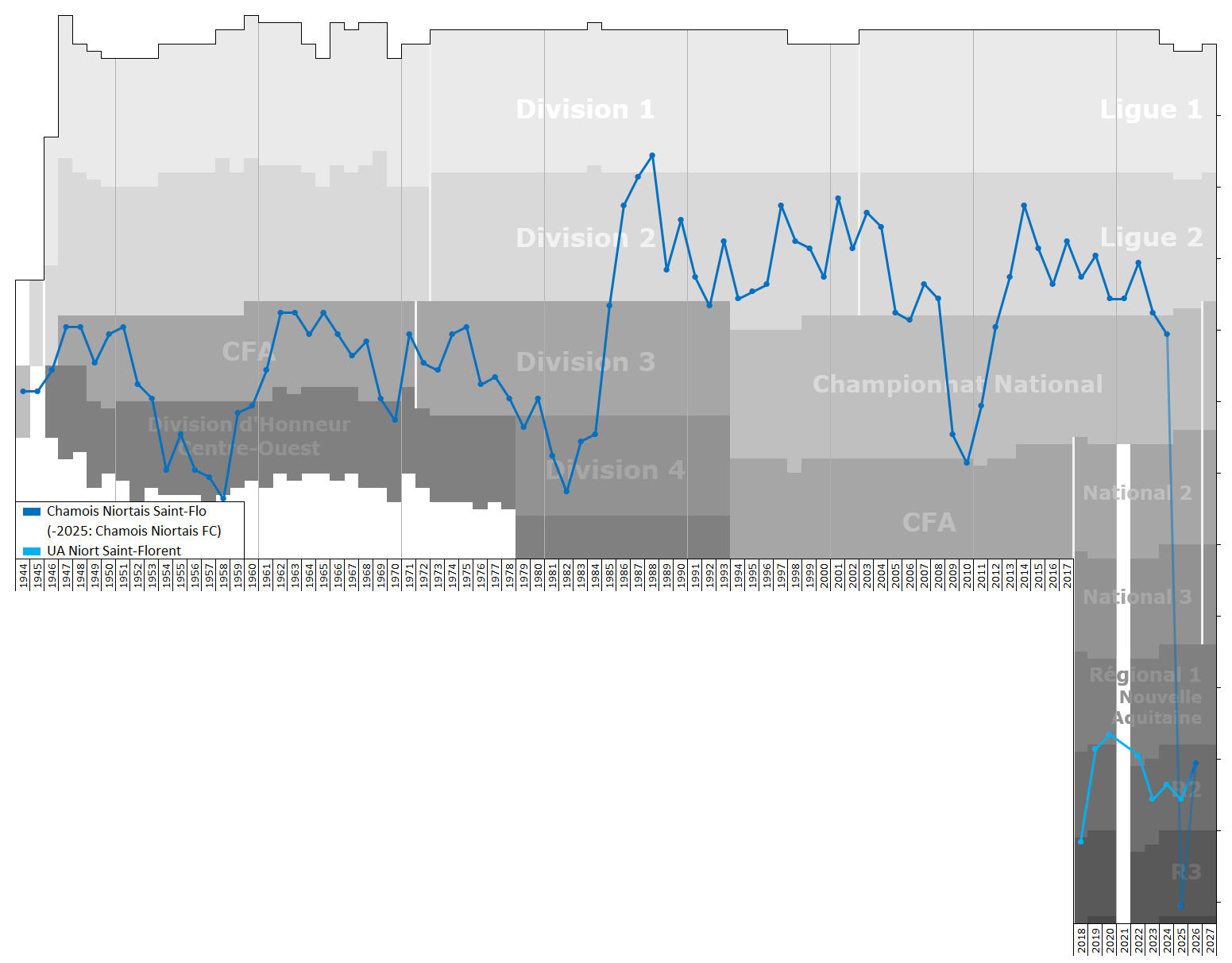
Historical league performance chart of Chamois niortais FC

=== After the Second World War ===
Chamois Niortais were relegated from the CFA to the DH Centre-Ouest in 1945. Led by Faczinek, who had returned to the club as player-manager in 1943, the side won the DH Centre-Ouest for three consecutive seasons. Faczinek left the club in 1948 and was replaced by former France international Maurice Banide. The team re-joined the CFA for the 1948–49 season and played in the division for the following five campaigns, achieving a second-place finish in 1951, when they finished behind Stade Quimpérois by five points. In 1953, the side finished bottom of the division and were relegated to the DH Centre-Ouest. Manager Nicolas Hibst was sacked and replaced by Georges Hatz, who had previously coached AJ Auxerre. The side remained in the DH Centre-Ouest until 1960 when, under the guidance of Nordine Ben Ali, they won the league title by a point ahead of Poitiers FC to return to the CFA.

The side struggled in their first season back in the third tier, achieving a tenth-placed finish. After being runners-up in the division for two consecutive seasons in 1961–62 and 1962–63, the team secured a number of mid-table league finishes under Kazimir Hnatow. After Hnatow left Chamois Niortais in 1966, the club's fortunes on the pitch began to diminish and they were eventually relegated at the end of the 1968–69 campaign after ending the season with just 12 points from 26 matches. Upon the restructuring of the league system, the team joined the newly formed Division 3 in 1970. They played there for the following eight years, but never finished higher than fourth in the division. In 1978, the club finished last and were again relegated to the fourth level, but were immediately promoted back to Division 3 after finishing as runners-up in 1979. However, they again finished bottom of the division and in 1980 returned to Division 4, where they played for the next four seasons. In April 1984, Patrick Parizon was appointed as manager and the following month, the side secured a third-placed finish to gain promotion back to Division 3. In 1984–85, the team lost only three matches in the entire campaign as they finished comfortably top of the division. A 2–1 victory over Montauban on 18 May 1985 confirmed their promotion to Division 2 for the first time in the history of Chamois Niortais.

=== Professional status ===
Thanks to the promotion, Chamois Niortais became a professional club for the 1985–86 season. The season began well for the side, as they achieved a 1–0 win against USL Dunkerque on 16 July 1985. They went on to accomplish a respectable fifth-placed finish in their first season with a total of 37 points. The next campaign saw unprecedented success for the team, as they racked up a 17-match unbeaten run on the way to the league championship. Their title triumph was confirmed with a 2–0 victory over US Orléans at the Stade René Gaillard on 23 May 1987.

The following season turned out to be the club's only season to date in the top tier of French football. The season began with a 1–1 draw with Lens and the side's first victory came against Montpellier on 1 August 1987. The team also managed a win in their first ever televised match, defeating Saint-Étienne 2–1 on 18 August 1987. After this promising start, the team languished around the bottom of the division for the majority of the campaign, and were eventually relegated back to Division 2 on 10 June 1988, after being beaten 3–0 by Caen, finishing just one point behind Lens.

The relegation saw the end of Patrick Parizon's reign as head coach as he was replaced by Victor Zvunka. Zvunka remained manager for the following three seasons, until the side were relegated to Division 3 at the end of the 1990–91 campaign. The team returned to the second tier after just one season as they comfortably won Division 3. The next 13 consecutive seasons saw a number of mid-table finishes in Ligue 2, until a poor 2004–05 campaign, in which the team lost 21 of their 38 league matches. Philippe Hinschberger was appointed as the new manager in 2005, and he successfully escaped from the Championnat National at the first attempt, securing the title with a 2–0 victory over Sporting Toulon Var on 13 May 2006. Niort found the following two seasons difficult in Ligue 2, finishing 16th in the 2006–07 season and then suffering relegation in 2007–08 after conceding an injury time goal to Boulogne.

=== Fall to amateur football and return to Ligue 2 ===
Denis Troch was hired as the club's new manager in August 2008, and despite hopes of a swift return to Ligue 2, the team performed poorly throughout the 2008–09 campaign. The side failed to win a league match during the first three months of the season, and that form continued into 2009. They went into their final match of the season, away at Pacy Vallée-d'Eure, requiring three points to avoid successive relegations. However, the side could only procure a 0–0 draw and were relegated to the Championnat de France amateur for the first time since 1970. The relegation saw the end of Chamois Niortais's era as a professional club, as they were forced to become a semi-professional outfit due to the DNCG rules. In June 2009, Pascal Gastien was appointed as manager for his third spell in charge of the club, handed the task of achieving promotion back to the Championnat National at the first attempt. The club won the CFA Group C that season, and was subsequently promoted back to the National division for the following campaign. Niort secured their third-tier status with an 11th-place finish in the 2010–11 season. The following season, the team finished as runners-up in the Championnat National behind Nîmes to return to Ligue 2 for the 2012–13 campaign and regain their professional status. On 14 May 2023, Niort were relegated to the Championnat National after finishing bottom of Ligue 2.

=== Administrative relegation and dissolution ===
On 1 August 2024, Niort was excluded from national competitions by the DNCG, synonymous with relegation to Régional 1. On 28 September 2024, it was confirmed that the first team would compete in the Régional 3, the eighth tier of French football. On 10 April 2025, the club was dissolved due to significant debt.

On 7 May 2025, it was announced that the club's "brand" would merge with UA Niort Saint-Florent, creating a new entity called Chamois Niortais Saint-Flo.

== Colours and badge ==
The commemorative kit worn in the 2007–08 season

The badge of Chamois Niortais features a chamois goat standing on a football, and the background of the crest is royal blue, which has featured in the club's home colours since its founding. When the club was founded in 1925, Chamois Niortais adopted a white strip. Since then, however, the club has usually played in a home strip of royal blue jersey, shorts and socks. In the 2007–08 season the team played in a gold and black kit for the first time, to commemorate 20 years since the club competed in Division 1.

For the following season, the home kit reverted to the usual all-blue strip and the jersey currently has a white sash across it. The away kit for the current season is the reverse of the home strip, and consists of a white jersey with blue sash, white shorts and white socks. For the 2009–10 season, the club's kits are produced by Italian sportswear company, Erreà, and the main shirt sponsor is Cheminées Poujoulat.

== Stadium ==
When Chamois Niortais were founded, the club had no fixed home ground and played friendly matches at various venues in and around Niort. In 1926, when the team joined the Ligue du Charentes, the club adopted the small Stade de Genève as their first home. They continued to play at the Stade de Genève for the majority of the following 50 years until, in the early 1970s, it was announced that the side would move into a new stadium. On 3 August 1974, the Stade Venise Verte was opened, with the inaugural game being an exhibition match between Chamois Niortais and Dynamo Kyiv. Some time later, the stadium was renamed the Stade René Gaillard in honour of René Gaillard, the former mayor of Niort.

At present, the stadium has four stands: the Tribune d'Honneur, the Tribune Pasages, the Tribune Populaire Nord, and the Tribune Populaire Sud. The four stands currently have a combined capacity of 10,898, with 1,324 of these being standing places. The stadium is typical of many continental European grounds, with an athletics track between the pitch and the stands. Next to the stadium there is a small annexed ground where the club's reserve and youth teams play their matches. The first televised match at the ground took place on 18 August 1987, when Saint-Étienne were beaten 2–1. The record attendance at the stadium was set on 24 October 1987, when 16,715 people saw Chamois Niortais defeat Marseille by two goals to one in a Division 1 encounter.

== Supporters ==
Chamois Niortais always had a relatively small fan base, with very few fans from outside the area around Niort. The club had one main supporters' organisation, named "Unicamox 79". The name is taken from "uni", the French for united, "camox", the Latin word meaning chamois. The 79 symbolises the department number of Deux-Sèvres. The organisation had no history of violence or extremism, and worked closely with the football club to try to improve the atmosphere at home matches.

The highest ever average attendance in a season was 10,142 during the club's Division 1 campaign of 1987–88. Since then, the average attendance has usually been under 5,000 spectators. In the 2008–09 season, the average was as low as 2,348 when the club was playing in the Championnat National.

== Managers ==
Since the appointment of the first Chamois Niortais manager, the Swiss coach Franchina, there have been 31 different first-team managers. Three of the coaches, Kazimir Hnatow, Robert Charrier and Pascal Gastien, have had more than one spell in charge of the club. The current manager is Pascal Gastien, who was given the job in 2009 after Denis Troch was sacked following the side's relegation from the Championnat National. Gastien, a former Chamois Niortais player, is currently in his third spell as manager. To date, the only manager to have coached the club in the top division of French football is Patrick Parizon, during the 1987–88 season. The club's longest-serving manager was Ferdinand Faczinek, who had a five-year tenure between 1943 and 1948.

== Club officials ==
Position	Name
Head coach	Bernard Simondi
Assistant coaches	Oumar Tchomogo; Andé Dona Ndoh; Gabriel Santos; Arnaud Gonzalez
Goalkeeping coaches	Pascal Landais
Fitness coaches	Jérémie Molton
Conditioning Coaches	Fabrice Fontaine
Youth coaches	Carl Tourenne
Video analyst	Bryan Lejonc; Stanislas Sinicki; Christophe Ott
Sporting directors / Chief Scout	Mikaël Hanouna
Sports Coordinators	Matthieu Sans
Coordinator of talent managements	Dodzi Eklu
Doctors	Christian Sieyamdji
Physiotherapists	Yassine Abada; Charles Mayot; Valentin Poret
Reathletists	Romain Faure
Osteopaths	Julien Goy
Team Manager	Julien Memeteau
Assistant Team Manager	Fabien Menu

=== Managerial history ===
Name	Year(s)
Franchina	1929–19xx
Luc Pilard	1940–1943
Ferdinand Faczinek	1943–1948
Maurice Banide	1948–1949
René Garnier	1949–1950
Nicolas Hibst	1950–1953
Georges Hatz	1953–1955
Jean Léost	1955–1957
Nordine Ben Ali	1957–1960
Henri Burda	1960–1963
Kazimir Hnatow	1963–1966
Maurice Cailleton	1966–1967
Jean-Claude Casties	1967–1969
Raymond Abad	1969–1971
Jean-Claude Lavaux	1971–1972
Robert Charrier and Kazimir Hnatow	1972–1973
Robert Charrier	1973–1977
Jean-Pierre Andres	1977–1978
Jean-Louis Memeteau	1978–1982
Gérard Proust	1982–1984
Patrick Parizon	1984–1988
Victor Zvunka	1988–1991

Name	Year(s)
Robert Buigues	1991–1995
Albert Rust	1995–1999
René Cédolin and Pascal Gastien (caretakers)	1999
Angel Marcos	1999–2001
Philippe Hinschberger	2001–2004
Vincent Dufour	2004–2005
Pascal Gastien	2005
Philippe Hinschberger	2005–2007
Faruk Hadžibegić	2007
Jacky Bonnevay	2007–2008
Samuel Michel	2008
Denis Troch	2008–2009
Pascal Gastien	2009–2014
Régis Brouard	2014–2016
Jean-Philippe Faure and Carl Tourenne (caretakers)	2016
Denis Renaud	2016–2018
Patrice Lair	2018
Jean-Philippe Faure (caretaker)	2018–2019
Pascal Plancque	2019–2020
Jean-Philippe Faure (caretaker)	2020
Franck Passi	2020
Sébastien Desabre	2020-2022

== Honours ==
Honour	Year(s)
Division 2 vice-champions	1986–87
Division 3 champions	1984–85, 1991–92
Championnat National champions	2005–06
Championnat de France amateur Group C winners	2009–10
DH Centre-Ouest champions	1945–46, 1946–47, 1947–48, 1959–60
Coupe de la Ligue du Centre-Ouest winners	1947, 1948, 1950, 1966, 1970, 1975, 1989, 1990, 1992, 1996, 2001

== Records ==
=== Club ===
- Biggest win: 6–0 (v. Valenciennes, Ligue 2, March 2018)
- Highest league finish: 18th, Division 1 (1987–88)
- Record home attendance: 16,715 (v. Marseille – 24 October 1987)

=== Players ===
- Most league appearances: 435 – Franck Azzopardi
- Most league goals: 61 – Andé Dona Ndoh
- Most league goals in one season: 17 – Walquir Mota (1995–96)

== See also ==
- List of Chamois Niortais F.C. players
