= 2003–04 FC Gueugnon season =

FC Gueugnon
2003–04 season
- Stadium: Stade Jean Laville
- Ligue 2: 16th
- Coupe de France: Round of 32
- Coupe de la Ligue: Quarter-finals

The 2003–04 season was the 64th season in the existence of FC Gueugnon and the club's eighth consecutive season in the second division of French football. In addition to the domestic league, FC Gueugnon participated in this season's editions of the Coupe de France and the Coupe de la Ligue.

== Pre-season and friendlies ==
Win Draw Loss Fixtures

== Competitions ==
=== Overall record ===
Competition	First match	Last match	Starting round	Final position	Record							
Competition	First match	Last match	Starting round	Final position	Pld	W	D	L	GF	GA	GD	Win %
Ligue 2	2 August 2003	22 May 2004	Matchday 1	16th	38	9	15	14	40	43	−3	23.68
Coupe de France	22 November 2003	24 January 2004	Seventh round	Round of 32	4	3	0	1	8	4	+4	75.00
Coupe de la Ligue	23 September 2003	14 January 2004	First round	Quarter-finals	4	2	1	1	6	3	+3	50.00
Total					46	14	16	16	54	50	+4	30.43

Source: Competitions

=== Ligue 2 ===
==== League table ====
Pos	Team	Pld	W	D	L	GF	GA	GD	Pts	Promotion or Relegation
14	Clermont	38	9	17	12	36	48	−12	44	
15	Grenoble	38	9	16	13	38	43	−5	43	
16	Gueugnon	38	9	15	14	40	43	−3	42	
17	Laval	38	10	12	16	51	55	−4	42	
18	Valence (R)	38	9	13	16	45	56	−11	40	Relegation to Championnat National [fr]

Source: Ligue 2
(R) Relegated

==== Results summary ====
Overall								Home						Away					
Pld	W	D	L	GF	GA	GD	Pts	W	D	L	GF	GA	GD	W	D	L	GF	GA	GD
38	9	15	14	40	43	−3	42	5	9	5	15	14	+1	4	6	9	25	29	−4

Source: Ligue 2

==== Results by round ====
Round	1	2	3	4	5	6	7	8	9	10	11	12	13	14	15	16	17	18	19	20	21	22	23	24	25	26	27	28	29	30	31	32	33	34	35	36	37	38
Ground	H	A	H	A	H	A	H	A	H	A	H	A	H	A	H	H	A	H	A	H	A	H	A	H	A	H	A	H	A	H	A	H	A	A	H	A	H	A
Result	D	D	L	D	W	D	W	L	D	L	D	W	D	L	L	D	L	L	L	D	L	W	L	L	D	D	L	D	D	D	L	W	W	W	L	D	W	W
Position	8	10	12	15	9	12	8	12	11	13	13	12	13	14	15	15	16	16	17	17	17	17	17	18	18	17	19	19	19	19	19	18	18	17	18	18	18	16

Source: Ligue 2
A = Away; H = Home; W = Win; D = Draw; L = Loss

==== Matches ====
2 August 2003 1	Gueugnon	1–1	Lorient
--:-- CEST (UTC+2)

9 August 2003 2	Créteil	1–1	Gueugnon
--:-- CEST (UTC+2)

16 August 2003 3	Gueugnon	0–1	Amiens
--:-- CEST (UTC+2)

19 August 2003 4	Besançon	1–1	Gueugnon
--:-- CEST (UTC+2)

23 August 2003 5	Gueugnon	2–0	Valence
--:-- CEST (UTC+2)

30 August 2003 6	Grenoble	2–2	Gueugnon
--:-- CEST (UTC+2)

5 September 2003 7	Gueugnon	2–1	Rouen
--:-- CEST (UTC+2)

13 September 2003 8	Caen	2–1	Gueugnon
--:-- CEST (UTC+2)

20 September 2003 9	Gueugnon	1–1	Troyes
--:-- CEST (UTC+2)

27 September 2003 10	Clermont	1–0	Gueugnon
--:-- CEST (UTC+2)

4 October 2003 11	Gueugnon	0–0	Sedan
--:-- CEST (UTC+2)

18 October 2003 12	Laval	1–2	Gueugnon
--:-- CEST (UTC+2)

25 October 2003 13	Gueugnon	1–1	Angers
--:-- CEST (UTC+2)

1 November 2003 14	Istres	2–1	Gueugnon
--:-- CET (UTC+1)

8 November 2003 15	Gueugnon	1–2	Niort
--:-- CET (UTC+1)

29 November 2003 16	Gueugnon	0–0	Nancy
--:-- CET (UTC+1)

3 December 2003 17	Le Havre	5–0	Gueugnon
--:-- CET (UTC+1)

6 December 2003 18	Gueugnon	0–1	Saint-Étienne
--:-- CET (UTC+1)

20 December 2003 19	Châteauroux	3–2	Gueugnon
--:-- CET (UTC+1)

10 January 2004 20	Gueugnon	1–1	Créteil
--:-- CET (UTC+1)

17 January 2004 21	Amiens	1–0	Gueugnon
--:-- CET (UTC+1)

31 January 2004 22	Gueugnon	1–0	Besançon
--:-- CET (UTC+1)

7 February 2004 23	Valence	3–1	Gueugnon
--:-- CET (UTC+1)

14 February 2004 24	Gueugnon	0–2	Grenoble
--:-- CET (UTC+1)

21 February 2004 25	Rouen	0–0	Gueugnon
--:-- CET (UTC+1)

28 February 2004 26	Gueugnon	0–0	Caen
--:-- CET (UTC+1)

6 March 2004 27	Troyes	2–1	Gueugnon
--:-- CET (UTC+1)

13 March 2004 28	Gueugnon	0–0	Clermont
--:-- CET (UTC+1)

20 March 2004 29	Sedan	1–1	Gueugnon
--:-- CET (UTC+1)

27 March 2004 30	Gueugnon	1–1	Laval
--:-- CET (UTC+1)

3 April 2004 31	Angers	2–1	Gueugnon
--:-- CEST (UTC+2)

10 April 2004 32	Gueugnon	1–0	Istres
--:-- CEST (UTC+2)

24 April 2004 33	Niort	1–3	Gueugnon
--:-- CEST (UTC+2)

1 May 2004 34	Nancy	0–2	Gueugnon
--:-- CEST (UTC+2)

8 May 2004 35	Gueugnon	1–2	Le Havre
--:-- CEST (UTC+2)

13 May 2004 36	Saint-Étienne	1–1	Gueugnon
--:-- CEST (UTC+2)

16 May 2004 37	Gueugnon	2–0	Châteauroux
--:-- CEST (UTC+2)

22 May 2004 38	Lorient	0–5	Gueugnon
--:-- CEST (UTC+2)

=== Coupe de la Ligue ===
29 October 2003 Round of 32	Gueugnon	1–1 (a.e.t.) (3–2 p)	Paris Saint-Germain	Gueugnon
16:05 CET (UTC+1)	Boutabout 15'		Reinaldo 62'	Stadium: Stade Jean Laville; Attendance: 8,407; Referee: Gilles Veissière

17 December 2003 Round of 16	Gueugnon	3–1	Bastia	Gueugnon
19:00 CET (UTC+1)				Stadium: Stade Jean Laville; Attendance: 6,238; Referee: Pascal Garibian

14 January 2004 Quarter-finals	Gueugnon	0–1	Auxerre	Gueugnon
19:00 CET (UTC+1)				Stadium: Stade Jean Laville; Attendance: 11,974; Referee: Claude Colombo
