= 2003–04 Chamois Niortais F.C. season =

Chamois Niortais F.C.
2003–04 season
- Head coach: Philippe Hinschberger
- Stadium: Stade René Gaillard
- Ligue 2: 8th
- Coupe de France: Eighth round
- Coupe de la Ligue: First round
- Top goalscorer: League: Stéphane Biakolo (11); All: Stéphane Biakolo (11)

The 2003–04 season was the 103rd season in the existence of Chamois Niortais F.C. and the club's 12th consecutive season in the second division of French football. In addition to the domestic league, Chamois Niortais F.C. participated in this season's editions of the Coupe de France and the Coupe de la Ligue.

== Pre-season and friendlies ==
Win Draw Loss

== Competitions ==
=== Overall record ===
Competition	First match	Last match	Starting round	Final position	Record							
Competition	First match	Last match	Starting round	Final position	Pld	W	D	L	GF	GA	GD	Win %
Ligue 2	2 August 2003	22 May 2004	Matchday 1	8th	38	13	14	11	47	44	+3	34.21
Coupe de France	22 November 2003	13 December 2003	Seventh round	Eighth round	2	1	0	1	7	5	+2	50.00
Coupe de la Ligue	23 September 2003		First round	First round	1	0	0	1	0	3	−3	0.00
Total					41	14	14	13	54	52	+2	34.15

Last updated: 22 May 2004
Source: Competitions

=== Ligue 2 ===
==== League table ====
Pos	Team	Pld	W	D	L	GF	GA	GD	Pts
6	Nancy	38	14	13	11	45	36	+9	55
7	Le Havre	38	15	10	13	44	46	−2	55
8	Niort	38	13	14	11	47	44	+3	53
9	Amiens	38	15	8	15	43	45	−2	53
10	Troyes	38	13	13	12	43	48	−5	52

Source: Ligue 2

==== Results summary ====
Overall								Home						Away					
Pld	W	D	L	GF	GA	GD	Pts	W	D	L	GF	GA	GD	W	D	L	GF	GA	GD
38	13	14	11	47	44	+3	53	8	6	5	26	18	+8	5	8	6	21	26	−5

Source: Ligue 2

==== Results by round ====
Round	1	2	3	4	5	6	7	8	9	10	11	12	13	14	15	16	17	18	19	20	21	22	23	24	25	26	27	28	29	30	31	32	33	34	35	36	37	38
Ground	H	A	H	A	H	A	H	A	H	A	H	A	H	H	A	H	A	H	A	H	A	H	A	H	A	H	A	H	A	H	A	A	H	A	H	A	H	A
Result	W	D	W	W	D	L	L	L	W	W	W	D	W	D	W	D	L	D	L	D	D	W	W	W	D	W	L	D	W	L	D	D	L	D	L	L	L	D
Position	1	4	3	1	1	3	6	11	7	4	3	3	2	3	2	2	5	6	6	6	7	7	5	4	4	3	4	4	4	4	4	5	6	6	7	8	9	8

Source: Ligue 2
A = Away; H = Home; W = Win; D = Draw; L = Loss

==== Matches ====
2 August 2003 1	Niort	3–0	Créteil
--:-- CEST (UTC+2)

9 August 2003 2	Sedan	1–1	Niort
--:-- CEST (UTC+2)

16 August 2003 3	Niort	1–0	Valence
--:-- CEST (UTC+2)

19 August 2003 4	Clermont	0–1	Niort
--:-- CEST (UTC+2)

23 August 2003 5	Niort	0–0	Amiens
--:-- CEST (UTC+2)

30 August 2003 6	Rouen	2–1	Niort
--:-- CEST (UTC+2)

5 September 2003 7	Niort	0–3	Caen
--:-- CEST (UTC+2)

12 September 2003 8	Troyes	3–1	Niort
--:-- CEST (UTC+2)

20 September 2003 9	Niort	3–0	Besançon
--:-- CEST (UTC+2)

27 September 2003 10	Grenoble	0–1	Niort
--:-- CEST (UTC+2)

4 October 2003 11	Niort	4–0	Laval
--:-- CEST (UTC+2)

18 October 2003 12	Angers	0–0	Niort
--:-- CEST (UTC+2)

26 October 2003 13	Niort	2–1	Istres
--:-- CEST (UTC+2)

3 November 2003 14	Niort	0–0	Le Havre
--:-- CET (UTC+1)

8 November 2003 15	Gueugnon	1–2	Niort
--:-- CET (UTC+1)

29 November 2003 16	Niort	0–0	Châteauroux
--:-- CET (UTC+1)

10 December 2003 17	Saint-Étienne	2–1	Niort
--:-- CET (UTC+1)

6 December 2003 18	Niort	2–2	Nancy
--:-- CET (UTC+1)

20 December 2003 19	Lorient	4–2	Niort
--:-- CET (UTC+1)

10 January 2004 20	Niort	1–1	Sedan
--:-- CET (UTC+1)

17 January 2004 21	Valence	1–1	Niort
--:-- CET (UTC+1)

31 January 2004 22	Niort	3–1	Clermont
--:-- CET (UTC+1)

7 February 2004 23	Amiens	2–3	Niort
--:-- CET (UTC+1)

14 February 2004 24	Niort	2–1	Rouen
--:-- CET (UTC+1)

23 February 2004 25	Caen	2–2	Niort
--:-- CET (UTC+1)

16 April 2004 26	Niort	2–1	Troyes
--:-- CET (UTC+1)

6 March 2004 27	Besançon	4–0	Niort
--:-- CET (UTC+1)

13 March 2004 28	Niort	1–1	Grenoble
--:-- CET (UTC+1)

20 March 2004 29	Laval	0–1	Niort
--:-- CET (UTC+1)

27 March 2004 30	Niort	0–1	Angers
--:-- CET (UTC+1)

5 April 2004 31	Istres	2–2	Niort
--:-- CEST (UTC+2)

10 April 2004 32	Le Havre	1–1	Niort
--:-- CEST (UTC+2)

24 April 2004 33	Niort	1–3	Gueugnon
--:-- CEST (UTC+2)

1 May 2004 34	Châteauroux	0–0	Niort
--:-- CEST (UTC+2)

7 May 2004 35	Niort	0–1	Saint-Étienne
--:-- CEST (UTC+2)

12 May 2004 36	Nancy	1–0	Niort
--:-- CEST (UTC+2)

16 May 2004 37	Niort	1–2	Lorient
--:-- CEST (UTC+2)

22 May 2004 38	Créteil	2–2	Niort
--:-- CEST (UTC+2)

=== Coupe de la Ligue ===
23 September 2003 First round	Clermont	3–0 (a.e.t.)	Niort
--:-- CEST (UTC+2)
