= 2003–04 CS Sedan Ardennes season =

CS Sedan Ardennes
2003–04 season
- Head coach: Dominique Bathenay
- Stadium: Stade Louis Dugauguez
- Ligue 2: 5th
- Coupe de France: Seventh round
- Coupe de la Ligue: Round of 16

The 2003–04 season was the 85th season in the existence of CS Sedan Ardennes and the club's first season back in the second division of French football. In addition to the domestic league, CS Sedan Ardennes participated in this season's editions of the Coupe de France and the Coupe de la Ligue.

== Pre-season and friendlies ==
Win Draw Loss

== Competitions ==
=== Overall record ===
Competition	First match	Last match	Starting round	Final position	Record							
Competition	First match	Last match	Starting round	Final position	Pld	W	D	L	GF	GA	GD	Win %
Ligue 2	2 August 2003	22 May 2004	Matchday 1	5th	38	15	15	8	42	31	+11	39.47
Coupe de France	21 November 2003		Seventh round	Seventh round	1	0	0	1	0	1	−1	0.00
Coupe de la Ligue	23 September 2003	17 December 2003	First round	Round of 16	3	1	1	1	3	3	+0	33.33
Total					42	16	16	10	45	35	+10	38.10

Last updated: 22 May 2004
Source: Competitions

=== Ligue 2 ===
==== League table ====
Pos	Team	Pld	W	D	L	GF	GA	GD	Pts	Promotion or Relegation
3	Istres (P)	38	19	9	10	44	26	+18	66	Promotion to Ligue 1
4	Lorient	38	17	10	11	57	45	+12	61	
5	Sedan	38	15	15	8	42	31	+11	60	
6	Nancy	38	14	13	11	45	36	+9	55	
7	Le Havre	38	15	10	13	44	46	−2	55	

Source: Ligue 2
(P) Promoted

==== Results summary ====
Overall								Home						Away					
Pld	W	D	L	GF	GA	GD	Pts	W	D	L	GF	GA	GD	W	D	L	GF	GA	GD
38	15	15	8	42	31	+11	60	11	6	2	31	13	+18	4	9	6	11	18	−7

Last updated: 22 May 2004.
Source: Ligue 2

==== Results by round ====
Round	1	2	3	4	5	6	7	8	9	10	11	12	13	14	15	16	17	18	19	20	21	22	23	24	25	26	27	28	29	30	31	32	33	34	35	36	37	38
Ground	A	H	A	H	A	H	A	H	A	H	A	A	H	A	H	A	H	A	H	A	H	A	H	A	H	A	H	A	H	H	A	H	A	H	A	H	A	H
Result	L	D	D	W	L	L	L	W	W	D	D	D	W	W	D	D	D	D	W	D	W	L	W	W	L	D	W	D	D	W	D	D	L	W	W	W	L	W
Position	19	17	15	10	16	18	19	17	13	12	12	13	12	9	10	9	10	9	8	9	9	10	8	7	8	9	8	9	8	8	8	8	8	7	5	5	5	5

Source: Ligue 2
A = Away; H = Home; W = Win; D = Draw; L = Loss

==== Matches ====
2 August 2003 1	Istres	2–0	Sedan	Istres
--:-- CEST (UTC+2)

9 August 2003 2	Sedan	1–1	Niort	Sedan
--:-- CEST (UTC+2)				Stadium: Stade Louis Dugauguez

16 August 2003 3	Angers	0–0	Sedan	Angers
--:-- CEST (UTC+2)

19 August 2003 4	Sedan	2–0	Châteauroux	Sedan
--:-- CEST (UTC+2)				Stadium: Stade Louis Dugauguez

22 August 2003 5	Le Havre	3–0	Sedan	Le Havre
--:-- CEST (UTC+2)

31 August 2003 6	Sedan	1–2	Saint-Étienne	Sedan
--:-- CEST (UTC+2)				Stadium: Stade Louis Dugauguez

5 September 2003 7	Nancy	2–0	Sedan	Tomblaine
--:-- CEST (UTC+2)

13 September 2003 8	Sedan	2–1	Lorient	Sedan
--:-- CEST (UTC+2)				Stadium: Stade Louis Dugauguez

20 September 2003 9	Créteil	0–1	Sedan	Créteil
--:-- CEST (UTC+2)

27 September 2003 10	Sedan	0–0	Valence	Sedan
--:-- CEST (UTC+2)				Stadium: Stade Louis Dugauguez

4 October 2003 11	Gueugnon	0–0	Sedan	Gueugnon
--:-- CEST (UTC+2)

20 October 2003 12	Amiens	1–1	Sedan	Amiens
--:-- CEST (UTC+2)

25 October 2003 13	Sedan	2–0	Besançon	Sedan
--:-- CEST (UTC+2)				Stadium: Stade Louis Dugauguez

1 November 2003 14	Rouen	0–1	Sedan	Rouen
--:-- CET (UTC+1)

8 November 2003 15	Sedan	0–0	Caen	Sedan
--:-- CET (UTC+1)				Stadium: Stade Louis Dugauguez

28 November 2003 16	Troyes	0–0	Sedan	Troyes
--:-- CET (UTC+1)				Stadium: Stade de l'Aube

3 December 2003 17	Sedan	1–1	Clermont	Sedan
--:-- CET (UTC+1)				Stadium: Stade Louis Dugauguez

6 December 2003 18	Grenoble	0–0	Sedan	Grenoble
--:-- CET (UTC+1)				Stadium: Stade Lesdiguières

20 December 2003 19	Sedan	1–0	Laval	Sedan
--:-- CET (UTC+1)				Stadium: Stade Louis Dugauguez

10 January 2004 20	Niort	1–1	Sedan
--:-- CET (UTC+1)

17 January 2004 21	Sedan	1–0	Angers	Sedan
--:-- CET (UTC+1)				Stadium: Stade Louis Dugauguez

31 January 2004 22	Châteauroux	2–0	Sedan	Châteauroux
--:-- CET (UTC+1)

7 February 2004 23	Sedan	2–0	Le Havre	Sedan
--:-- CET (UTC+1)				Stadium: Stade Louis Dugauguez

14 February 2004 24	Saint-Étienne	0–2	Sedan	Saint-Étienne
--:-- CET (UTC+1)

21 February 2004 25	Sedan	0–4	Nancy	Sedan
--:-- CET (UTC+1)				Stadium: Stade Louis Dugauguez

28 February 2004 26	Lorient	1–1	Sedan	Lorient
--:-- CET (UTC+1)

6 March 2004 27	Sedan	4–0	Créteil	Sedan
--:-- CET (UTC+1)				Stadium: Stade Louis Dugauguez

13 March 2004 28	Valence	2–2	Sedan	Valence
--:-- CET (UTC+1)

20 March 2004 29	Sedan	1–1	Gueugnon	Sedan
--:-- CET (UTC+1)				Stadium: Stade Louis Dugauguez

27 March 2004 30	Sedan	3–1	Amiens	Sedan
--:-- CET (UTC+1)				Stadium: Stade Louis Dugauguez

3 April 2004 31	Besançon	1–1	Sedan	Besançon
--:-- CEST (UTC+2)

10 April 2004 32	Sedan	0–0	Rouen	Sedan
--:-- CEST (UTC+2)				Stadium: Stade Louis Dugauguez

24 April 2004 33	Caen	1–0	Sedan	Caen
--:-- CEST (UTC+2)

1 May 2004 34	Sedan	3–0	Troyes	Sedan
--:-- CEST (UTC+2)				Stadium: Stade Louis Dugauguez

8 May 2004 35	Clermont	0–1	Sedan	Clermont
--:-- CEST (UTC+2)

12 May 2004 36	Sedan	4–1	Grenoble	Sedan
--:-- CEST (UTC+2)				Stadium: Stade Louis Dugauguez

16 May 2004 37	Laval	2–0	Sedan	Laval
--:-- CEST (UTC+2)

22 May 2004 38	Sedan	3–1	Istres	Sedan
--:-- CEST (UTC+2)				Stadium: Stade Louis Dugauguez
