= 2003–04 ASOA Valence season =

ASOA Valence
2003–04 season
- Stadium: Stade Georges Pompidou
- Ligue 2: 18th (relegated)
- Coupe de France: Round of 32
- Coupe de la Ligue: Round of 32

The 2003–04 season was the 84th season in the existence of ASOA Valence and the club's second consecutive season in the second division of French football. In addition to the domestic league, ASOA Valence participated in this season's editions of the Coupe de France and the Coupe de la Ligue.

== Pre-season and friendlies ==
Win Draw Loss Fixtures

== Competitions ==
=== Overall record ===
Competition	First match	Last match	Starting round	Final position	Record							
Competition	First match	Last match	Starting round	Final position	Pld	W	D	L	GF	GA	GD	Win %
Ligue 2	2 August 2003	22 May 2004	Matchday 1	18th	38	9	13	16	45	56	−11	23.68
Coupe de France	13 December 2003	24 January 2004	Seventh round	Round of 32	4	2	2	0	8	3	+5	50.00
Coupe de la Ligue	23 September 2003	29 October 2003	First round	Round of 32	2	1	0	1	3	3	+0	50.00
Total					44	12	15	17	56	62	−6	27.27

Last updated: 22 May 2004
Source: Competitions

=== Ligue 2 ===
==== League table ====
Pos	Team	Pld	W	D	L	GF	GA	GD	Pts	Promotion or Relegation
16	Gueugnon	38	9	15	14	40	43	−3	42	
17	Laval	38	10	12	16	51	55	−4	42	
18	Valence (R)	38	9	13	16	45	56	−11	40	Relegation to Championnat National [fr]
19	Besançon (R)	38	8	14	16	37	45	−8	38	Relegation to Championnat National [fr]
20	Rouen (R)	38	5	14	19	27	50	−23	29	Relegation to Championnat National [fr]

Source: Ligue 2
(R) Relegated

==== Results summary ====
Overall								Home						Away					
Pld	W	D	L	GF	GA	GD	Pts	W	D	L	GF	GA	GD	W	D	L	GF	GA	GD
38	9	13	16	45	56	−11	40	7	6	6	27	24	+3	2	7	10	18	32	−14

Last updated: 22 May 2004.
Source: Ligue 2

==== Results by round ====
Round	1	2	3	4	5	6	7	8	9	10	11	12	13	14	15	16	17	18	19	20	21	22	23	24	25	26	27	28	29	30	31	32	33	34	35	36	37	38
Ground	A	H	A	H	A	H	A	H	A	A	H	A	H	A	H	A	H	A	H	A	H	A	H	A	H	A	H	H	A	H	A	H	A	H	A	H	A	H
Result	W	W	L	L	L	D	L	D	L	D	W	D	W	L	W	D	L	D	D	L	D	L	W	D	L	L	L	D	D	W	W	L	D	D	L	W	L	L
Position	2	1	4	5	8	13	16	15	16	17	14	14	14	15	13	13	13	13	13	14	14	15	14	15	15	15	15	15	15	15	14	15	15	15	16	15	16	18

Source: Ligue 2
A = Away; H = Home; W = Win; D = Draw; L = Loss

==== Matches ====
2 August 2003 1	Angers	0–2	Valence	Angers
20:00 CEST (UTC+2)		Report	Tchomogo 13' (pen.); Moreira 20'	Stadium: Stade Raymond Kopa; Attendance: 4,948; Referee: Didier Falcone

9 August 2003 2	Valence	3–0	Châteauroux
--:-- CEST (UTC+2)

16 August 2003 3	Niort	1–0	Valence
--:-- CEST (UTC+2)

19 August 2003 4	Valence	1–2	Le Havre
--:-- CEST (UTC+2)

23 August 2003 5	Gueugnon	2–0	Valence
--:-- CEST (UTC+2)

30 August 2003 6	Valence	0–0	Nancy
--:-- CEST (UTC+2)

5 September 2003 7	Saint-Étienne	1–0	Valence
--:-- CEST (UTC+2)

13 September 2003 8	Valence	2–2	Créteil
--:-- CEST (UTC+2)

20 September 2003 9	Lorient	3–1	Valence
--:-- CEST (UTC+2)

27 September 2003 10	Sedan	0–0	Valence
--:-- CEST (UTC+2)

4 October 2003 11	Valence	2–1	Amiens
--:-- CEST (UTC+2)

18 October 2003 12	Besançon	1–1	Valence
--:-- CEST (UTC+2)

25 October 2003 13	Valence	2–1	Troyes
--:-- CEST (UTC+2)

1 November 2003 14	Caen	4–1	Valence
--:-- CET (UTC+1)

8 November 2003 15	Valence	2–1	Rouen
--:-- CET (UTC+1)

29 November 2003 16	Clermont	1–1	Valence
--:-- CET (UTC+1)

17 December 2003 17	Valence	1–2	Grenoble
--:-- CET (UTC+1)

6 December 2003 18	Laval	2–2	Valence
--:-- CET (UTC+1)

20 December 2003 19	Valence	0–0	Istres
--:-- CET (UTC+1)

10 January 2004 20	Châteauroux	3–0	Valence
--:-- CET (UTC+1)

17 January 2004 21	Valence	1–1	Niort
--:-- CET (UTC+1)

31 January 2004 22	Le Havre	1–0	Valence
--:-- CET (UTC+1)

7 February 2004 23	Valence	3–1	Gueugnon
--:-- CET (UTC+1)

14 February 2004 24	Nancy	1–1	Valence
--:-- CET (UTC+1)

21 February 2004 25	Valence	1–3	Saint-Étienne
--:-- CET (UTC+1)

28 February 2004 26	Créteil	2–1	Valence
--:-- CET (UTC+1)

6 March 2004 27	Valence	1–2	Lorient
--:-- CET (UTC+1)

13 March 2004 28	Valence	2–2	Sedan
--:-- CET (UTC+1)

20 March 2004 29	Amiens	2–2	Valence
--:-- CET (UTC+1)

27 March 2004 30	Valence	3–1	Besançon
--:-- CET (UTC+1)

3 April 2004 31	Troyes	0–1	Valence
--:-- CEST (UTC+2)

10 April 2004 32	Valence	0–2	Caen
--:-- CEST (UTC+2)

24 April 2004 33	Rouen	1–1	Valence
--:-- CEST (UTC+2)

1 May 2004 34	Valence	1–1	Clermont
--:-- CEST (UTC+2)

8 May 2004 35	Grenoble	4–3	Valence
--:-- CEST (UTC+2)

12 May 2004 36	Valence	2–1	Laval
--:-- CEST (UTC+2)

16 May 2004 37	Istres	3–1	Valence
--:-- CEST (UTC+2)

22 May 2004 38	Valence	0–1	Angers
--:-- CEST (UTC+2)

=== Coupe de France ===
3 January 2004 Round of 64	RC Épernay Champagne	0–0 (a.e.t.) (3–5 p)	Valence	Épernay
20:00 CET (UTC+1)				Stadium: Stade Paul Chandon; Attendance: 631; Referee: Thierry Desessart

24 January 2004 Round of 32	Valence	2–2 (a.e.t.) (4–5 p)	Châteauroux	Valence
20:00 CET (UTC+1)				Stadium: Stade Georges Pompidou; Attendance: 1,084; Referee: Bruno Ruffray

=== Coupe de la Ligue ===
23 September 2003 First round	Valence	1–0	Angers	Valence
--:-- CEST (UTC+2)

29 October 2003 Round of 32	Sochaux	3–2 (a.e.t.)	Valence	Montbéliard
--:-- CEST (UTC+2)
