= 2003–04 FC Rouen season =

FC Rouen
2003–04 season
- Head coach: Yves Brécheteau
- Stadium: Stade Robert Diochon
- Ligue 2: 20th (relegated)
- Coupe de France: Seventh round
- Coupe de la Ligue: First round

The 2003–04 season was the 105th season in the existence of FC Rouen and the club's first season back in the second division of French football. In addition to the domestic league, FC Rouen participated in this season's editions of the Coupe de France and the Coupe de la Ligue.

== Pre-season and friendlies ==
Win Draw Loss

== Competitions ==
=== Overall record ===
Competition	First match	Last match	Starting round	Final position	Record							
Competition	First match	Last match	Starting round	Final position	Pld	W	D	L	GF	GA	GD	Win %
Ligue 2	2 August 2003	22 May 2004	Matchday 1	20th	38	5	14	19	27	50	−23	13.16
Coupe de France	22 November 2003		Seventh round	Seventh round	1	0	1	0	0	0	+0	0.00
Coupe de la Ligue	24 September 2003		First round	First round	1	0	0	1	0	1	−1	0.00
Total					40	5	15	20	27	51	−24	12.50

Last updated: 22 May 2004
Source: Competitions

=== Ligue 2 ===
==== League table ====
Pos	Team	Pld	W	D	L	GF	GA	GD	Pts	Promotion or Relegation
16	Gueugnon	38	9	15	14	40	43	−3	42	
17	Laval	38	10	12	16	51	55	−4	42	
18	Valence (R)	38	9	13	16	45	56	−11	40	Relegation to Championnat National [fr]
19	Besançon (R)	38	8	14	16	37	45	−8	38	Relegation to Championnat National [fr]
20	Rouen (R)	38	5	14	19	27	50	−23	29	Relegation to Championnat National [fr]

Source: Ligue 2
(R) Relegated

==== Results summary ====
Overall								Home						Away					
Pld	W	D	L	GF	GA	GD	Pts	W	D	L	GF	GA	GD	W	D	L	GF	GA	GD
38	5	14	19	27	50	−23	29	4	7	8	19	23	−4	1	7	11	8	27	−19

Last updated: 22 May 2004.
Source: Ligue 2

==== Results by round ====
Round	1	2	3	4	5	6	7	8	9	10	11	12	13	14	15	16	17	18	19	20	21	22	23	24	25	26	27	28	29	30	31	32	33	34	35	36	37	38
Ground	A	H	A	H	A	H	A	H	A	H	A	H	A	H	A	H	A	A	H	A	H	A	H	A	H	A	H	A	H	A	H	A	H	A	H	H	A	H
Result	D	D	D	W	D	W	L	D	L	L	L	D	L	L	L	D	L	D	L	D	L	W	L	L	D	L	W	L	L	D	L	D	D	L	W	L	L	D
Position	12	11	11	6	7	4	9	9	12	14	17	16	17	18	18	18	19	19	19	20	20	19	20	20	20	20	20	20	20	20	20	20	20	20	20	20	20	20

Source: Ligue 2
A = Away; H = Home; W = Win; D = Draw; L = Loss

==== Matches ====
2 August 2003 1	Clermont	0–0	Rouen
--:-- CEST (UTC+2)

9 August 2003 2	Rouen	1–1	Laval
--:-- CEST (UTC+2)

16 August 2003 3	Grenoble	0–0	Rouen
--:-- CEST (UTC+2)

19 August 2003 4	Rouen	3–1	Angers
--:-- CEST (UTC+2)

23 August 2003 5	Istres	0–0	Rouen
--:-- CEST (UTC+2)

30 August 2003 6	Rouen	2–1	Niort
--:-- CEST (UTC+2)

5 September 2003 7	Gueugnon	2–1	Rouen
--:-- CEST (UTC+2)

13 September 2003 8	Rouen	1–1	Nancy
--:-- CEST (UTC+2)

20 September 2003 9	Le Havre	2–0	Rouen
--:-- CEST (UTC+2)

27 September 2003 10	Rouen	1–4	Châteauroux
--:-- CEST (UTC+2)

3 October 2003 11	Saint-Étienne	2–0	Rouen
--:-- CEST (UTC+2)

18 October 2003 12	Rouen	1–1	Créteil
--:-- CEST (UTC+2)

25 October 2003 13	Lorient	4–1	Rouen
--:-- CEST (UTC+2)

1 November 2003 14	Rouen	0–1	Sedan
--:-- CET (UTC+1)

8 November 2003 15	Valence	2–1	Rouen
--:-- CET (UTC+1)

29 November 2003 16	Rouen	1–1	Besançon
--:-- CET (UTC+1)

3 December 2003 17	Amiens	2–1	Rouen
--:-- CET (UTC+1)

7 December 2003 18	Caen	1–1	Rouen
--:-- CET (UTC+1)

20 December 2003 19	Rouen	0–1	Troyes
--:-- CET (UTC+1)

10 January 2004 20	Laval	0–0	Rouen
--:-- CET (UTC+1)

17 January 2004 21	Rouen	0–2	Grenoble
--:-- CET (UTC+1)

31 January 2004 22	Angers	0–1	Rouen
--:-- CET (UTC+1)

7 February 2004 23	Rouen	1–3	Istres
--:-- CET (UTC+1)

14 February 2004 24	Niort	2–1	Rouen
--:-- CET (UTC+1)

21 February 2004 25	Rouen	0–0	Gueugnon
--:-- CET (UTC+1)

28 February 2004 26	Nancy	2–1	Rouen
--:-- CET (UTC+1)

6 March 2004 27	Rouen	4–0	Le Havre
--:-- CET (UTC+1)

13 March 2004 28	Châteauroux	2–0	Rouen
--:-- CET (UTC+1)

20 March 2004 29	Rouen	0–1	Saint-Étienne
--:-- CET (UTC+1)

27 March 2004 30	Créteil	0–0	Rouen
--:-- CET (UTC+1)

3 April 2004 31	Rouen	0–1	Lorient
--:-- CEST (UTC+2)

10 April 2004 32	Sedan	0–0	Rouen
--:-- CEST (UTC+2)

24 April 2004 33	Rouen	1–1	Valence
--:-- CEST (UTC+2)

1 May 2004 34	Besançon	3–0	Rouen
--:-- CEST (UTC+2)

8 May 2004 35	Rouen	2–1	Amiens
--:-- CEST (UTC+2)

12 May 2004 36	Rouen	1–2	Caen
--:-- CEST (UTC+2)

16 May 2004 37	Troyes	3–0	Rouen
--:-- CEST (UTC+2)

22 May 2004 38	Rouen	0–0	Clermont
--:-- CEST (UTC+2)
