= 2003–04 US Créteil-Lusitanos season =

US Créteil-Lusitanos
2003–04 season
- Head coach: Jean-Michel Cavalli
- Stadium: Stade Dominique Duvauchelle
- Ligue 2: 12th
- Coupe de France: Round of 16
- Coupe de la Ligue: Round of 32

The 2003–04 season was the 68th season in the existence of US Créteil-Lusitanos and the club's fifth consecutive season in the second division of French football. In addition to the domestic league, US Créteil-Lusitanos participated in this season's editions of the Coupe de France and the Coupe de la Ligue.

== Pre-season and friendlies ==
Win Draw Loss

== Competitions ==
=== Overall record ===
| Competition | First match | Last match | Starting round | Final position | Record | | | | | | | |
| Competition | First match | Last match | Starting round | Final position | Pld | W | D | L | GF | GA | GD | Win % |
|---|---|---|---|---|---|---|---|---|---|---|---|---|
| Ligue 2 | 2 August 2003 | 22 May 2004 | Matchday 1 | 12th | 38 | 10 | 15 | 13 | 41 | 47 | −6 | 26.32 |
| Coupe de France | 22 November 2003 | 11 February 2004 | Seventh round | Round of 16 | 5 | 3 | 1 | 1 | 9 | 5 | +4 | 60.00 |
| Coupe de la Ligue | 23 September 2003 | 28 October 2003 | First round | Round of 32 | 2 | 1 | 0 | 1 | 3 | 3 | +0 | 50.00 |
| Total | | | | | 45 | 14 | 16 | 15 | 53 | 55 | −2 | 31.11 |

Source: Competitions

=== Ligue 2 ===
==== League table ====
| Pos | Team | Pld | W | D | L | GF | GA | GD | Pts |
|---|---|---|---|---|---|---|---|---|---|
| 10 | Troyes | 38 | 13 | 13 | 12 | 43 | 48 | −5 | 52 |
| 11 | Châteauroux | 38 | 13 | 10 | 15 | 44 | 49 | −5 | 49 |
| 12 | Créteil | 38 | 10 | 15 | 13 | 41 | 47 | −6 | 45 |
| 13 | Angers | 38 | 11 | 12 | 15 | 36 | 43 | −7 | 45 |
| 14 | Clermont | 38 | 9 | 17 | 12 | 36 | 48 | −12 | 44 |

Source: Ligue 2

==== Results summary ====
| Overall | | | | | | | | Home | | | | | | Away | | | | | |
| Pld | W | D | L | GF | GA | GD | Pts | W | D | L | GF | GA | GD | W | D | L | GF | GA | GD |
|---|---|---|---|---|---|---|---|---|---|---|---|---|---|---|---|---|---|---|---|
| 38 | 10 | 15 | 13 | 41 | 47 | −6 | 45 | 7 | 8 | 4 | 24 | 17 | +7 | 3 | 7 | 9 | 17 | 30 | −13 |

Source: Ligue 2

==== Results by round ====
| Round | 1 | 2 | 3 | 4 | 5 | 6 | 7 | 8 | 9 | 10 | 11 | 12 | 13 | 14 | 15 | 16 | 17 | 18 | 19 | 20 | 21 | 22 | 23 | 24 | 25 | 26 | 27 | 28 | 29 | 30 | 31 | 32 | 33 | 34 | 35 | 36 | 37 | 38 |
|---|---|---|---|---|---|---|---|---|---|---|---|---|---|---|---|---|---|---|---|---|---|---|---|---|---|---|---|---|---|---|---|---|---|---|---|---|---|---|
| Ground | A | H | A | H | A | H | A | A | H | A | H | A | H | A | H | A | H | A | H | A | H | A | H | A | H | H | A | H | A | H | A | H | A | H | A | H | A | H |
| Result | L | D | D | W | L | W | W | D | L | L | W | D | D | D | D | D | W | L | D | D | L | L | W | W | W | W | L | D | L | D | W | L | D | D | L | L | L | D |
| Position | 20 | 19 | 17 | 13 | 17 | 11 | 7 | 7 | 10 | 11 | 11 | 10 | 10 | 11 | 12 | 12 | 9 | 10 | 11 | 11 | 11 | 12 | 12 | 12 | 10 | 10 | 10 | 10 | 10 | 10 | 10 | 10 | 12 | 12 | 12 | 12 | 12 | 12 |

Source: Ligue 2
A = Away; H = Home; W = Win; D = Draw; L = Loss

==== Matches ====
| 2 August 2003 1 | Niort | 3–0 | Créteil |
| --:-- CEST (UTC+2) |

| 9 August 2003 2 | Créteil | 1–1 | Gueugnon |
| --:-- CEST (UTC+2) |

| 16 August 2003 3 | Le Havre | 1–1 | Créteil |
| --:-- CEST (UTC+2) |

| 19 August 2003 4 | Créteil | 1–0 | Saint-Étienne |
| --:-- CEST (UTC+2) |

| 23 August 2003 5 | Nancy | 2–0 | Créteil |
| --:-- CEST (UTC+2) |

| 30 August 2003 6 | Créteil | 1–0 | Lorient |
| --:-- CEST (UTC+2) |

| 5 September 2003 7 | Châteauroux | 1–3 | Créteil |
| --:-- CEST (UTC+2) |

| 13 September 2003 8 | Valence | 2–2 | Créteil |
| --:-- CEST (UTC+2) |

| 20 September 2003 9 | Créteil | 0–1 | Sedan |
| --:-- CEST (UTC+2) |

| 27 September 2003 10 | Amiens | 1–0 | Créteil |
| --:-- CEST (UTC+2) |

| 4 October 2003 11 | Créteil | 5–1 | Clermont |
| --:-- CEST (UTC+2) |

| 18 October 2003 12 | Rouen | 1–1 | Créteil |
| --:-- CEST (UTC+2) |

| 25 October 2003 13 | Créteil | 0–0 | Caen |
| --:-- CEST (UTC+2) |

| 1 November 2003 14 | Troyes | 0–0 | Créteil |
| --:-- CET (UTC+1) |

| 8 November 2003 15 | Créteil | 1–1 | Besançon |
| --:-- CET (UTC+1) |

| 29 November 2003 16 | Grenoble | 1–1 | Créteil |
| --:-- CET (UTC+1) |

| 3 December 2003 17 | Créteil | 3–0 | Laval |
| --:-- CET (UTC+1) |

| 7 December 2003 18 | Istres | 2–0 | Créteil |
| --:-- CET (UTC+1) |

| 20 December 2003 19 | Créteil | 1–1 | Angers |
| --:-- CET (UTC+1) |

| 10 January 2004 20 | Gueugnon | 1–1 | Créteil |
| --:-- CET (UTC+1) |

| 17 January 2004 21 | Créteil | 2–3 | Le Havre |
| --:-- CET (UTC+1) |

| 31 January 2004 20 | Saint-Étienne | 3–2 | Créteil |
| --:-- CET (UTC+1) |

| 7 February 2004 23 | Créteil | 1–0 | Nancy |
| --:-- CET (UTC+1) |

| 14 February 2004 24 | Lorient | 0–3 | Créteil |
| --:-- CET (UTC+1) |

| 21 February 2004 25 | Créteil | 1–0 | Châteauroux |
| --:-- CET (UTC+1) |

| 28 February 2004 26 | Créteil | 2–1 | Valence |
| --:-- CET (UTC+1) |

| 6 March 2004 27 | Sedan | 4–0 | Créteil |
| --:-- CET (UTC+1) |

| 13 March 2004 28 | Créteil | 1–1 | Amiens |
| --:-- CET (UTC+1) |

| 20 March 2004 29 | Clermont | 2–0 | Créteil |
| --:-- CET (UTC+1) |

| 27 March 2004 30 | Créteil | 0–0 | Rouen |
| --:-- CET (UTC+1) |

| 3 April 2004 31 | Caen | 1–2 | Créteil |
| --:-- CEST (UTC+2) |

| 10 April 2004 32 | Créteil | 1–2 | Troyes |
| --:-- CEST (UTC+2) |

| 24 April 2004 33 | Besançon | 0–0 | Créteil |
| --:-- CEST (UTC+2) |

| 1 May 2004 34 | Créteil | 1–1 | Grenoble |
| --:-- CEST (UTC+2) |

| 8 May 2004 35 | Laval | 3–1 | Créteil |
| --:-- CEST (UTC+2) |

| 12 May 2004 36 | Créteil | 0–2 | Istres |
| --:-- CEST (UTC+2) |

| 16 May 2004 37 | Angers | 2–0 | Créteil |
| --:-- CEST (UTC+2) |

| 22 May 2004 38 | Créteil | 2–2 | Niort |
| --:-- CEST (UTC+2) |
