= 2003–04 ES Troyes AC season =

ES Troyes AC
2003–04 season
- Stadium: Stade de l'Aube
- Ligue 2: 10th
- Coupe de France: Round of 64
- Coupe de la Ligue: Round of 16

The 2003–04 season was the 18th season in the existence of ES Troyes AC and the club's first season back in the second division of French football. In addition to the domestic league, ES Troyes AC participated in this season's editions of the Coupe de France and the Coupe de la Ligue.

== Pre-season and friendlies ==
Win Draw Loss

== Competitions ==
=== Overall record ===
Competition	First match	Last match	Starting round	Final position	Record							
Competition	First match	Last match	Starting round	Final position	Pld	W	D	L	GF	GA	GD	Win %
Ligue 2	2 August 2003	22 May 2004	Matchday 1	10th	38	13	13	12	43	48	−5	34.21
Coupe de France	22 November 2003	4 January 2004	Seventh round	Round of 64	3	2	0	1	7	4	+3	66.67
Coupe de la Ligue	23 September 2003	17 December 2003	First round	Round of 16	3	2	0	1	4	4	+0	66.67
Total					44	17	13	14	54	56	−2	38.64

Last updated: 22 May 2004
Source: Competitions

=== Ligue 2 ===
==== League table ====
Pos	Team	Pld	W	D	L	GF	GA	GD	Pts
8	Niort	38	13	14	11	47	44	+3	53
9	Amiens	38	15	8	15	43	45	−2	53
10	Troyes	38	13	13	12	43	48	−5	52
11	Châteauroux	38	13	10	15	44	49	−5	49
12	Créteil	38	10	15	13	41	47	−6	45

Source: Ligue 2

==== Results summary ====
Overall								Home						Away					
Pld	W	D	L	GF	GA	GD	Pts	W	D	L	GF	GA	GD	W	D	L	GF	GA	GD
38	13	13	12	43	48	−5	52	8	8	3	29	18	+11	5	5	9	14	30	−16

Source: Ligue 2

==== Results by round ====
Round	1	2	3	4	5	6	7	8	9	10	11	12	13	14	15	16	17	18	19	20	21	22	23	24	25	26	27	28	29	30	31	32	33	34	35	36	37	38
Ground	H	H	A	H	A	H	A	H	A	H	A	H	A	H	A	H	A	H	A	A	H	A	H	A	H	A	H	A	H	A	H	A	H	A	H	A	H	A
Result	D	W	D	D	W	L	L	W	D	W	L	W	L	D	D	D	L	D	W	W	W	L	L	D	D	L	W	L	D	D	L	W	W	L	D	W	W	L
Position	6	6	6	7	4	6	12	6	8	5	10	6	7	8	8	8	11	11	10	8	8	8	9	9	11	12	11	12	12	12	11	12	11	11	11	11	10	10

Source: Ligue 2
A = Away; H = Home; W = Win; D = Draw; L = Loss

==== Matches ====
2 August 2003 1	Troyes	2–2	Caen	Troyes
--:-- CEST (UTC+2)				Stadium: Stade de l'Aube

9 August 2003 2	Troyes	3–2	Grenoble	Troyes
--:-- CEST (UTC+2)				Stadium: Stade de l'Aube

16 August 2003 3	Clermont	0–0	Troyes	Clermont-Ferrand
--:-- CEST (UTC+2)

19 August 2003 4	Troyes	0–0	Laval	Troyes
--:-- CEST (UTC+2)				Stadium: Stade de l'Aube

23 August 2003 5	Saint-Étienne	2–3	Troyes	Saint-Étienne
--:-- CEST (UTC+2)

30 August 2003 6	Troyes	0–2	Istres	Troyes
--:-- CEST (UTC+2)				Stadium: Stade de l'Aube

5 September 2003 7	Angers	2–0	Troyes
--:-- CEST (UTC+2)

12 September 2003 8	Troyes	3–1	Niort	Troyes
--:-- CEST (UTC+2)				Stadium: Stade de l'Aube

20 September 2003 9	Gueugnon	1–1	Troyes
--:-- CEST (UTC+2)

27 September 2003 10	Troyes	2–0	Le Havre	Troyes
--:-- CEST (UTC+2)				Stadium: Stade de l'Aube

4 October 2003 11	Nancy	3–0	Troyes
--:-- CEST (UTC+2)

18 October 2003 12	Troyes	4–0	Châteauroux	Troyes
--:-- CEST (UTC+2)				Stadium: Stade de l'Aube

25 October 2003 13	Valence	2–1	Troyes
--:-- CEST (UTC+2)

1 November 2003 14	Troyes	0–0	Créteil	Troyes
--:-- CET (UTC+1)				Stadium: Stade de l'Aube

8 November 2003 15	Amiens	1–1	Troyes	Amiens
--:-- CET (UTC+1)

28 November 2003 16	Troyes	0–0	Sedan	Troyes
--:-- CET (UTC+1)				Stadium: Stade de l'Aube

4 December 2003 17	Lorient	1–0	Troyes
--:-- CET (UTC+1)

7 December 2003 18	Troyes	1–1	Besançon	Troyes
--:-- CET (UTC+1)				Stadium: Stade de l'Aube

20 December 2003 19	Rouen	0–1	Troyes	Rouen
--:-- CET (UTC+1)

10 January 2004 20	Grenoble	1–2	Troyes	Grenoble
--:-- CET (UTC+1)

17 January 2004 21	Troyes	2–0	Clermont	Troyes
--:-- CET (UTC+1)				Stadium: Stade de l'Aube

31 January 2004 22	Laval	4–0	Troyes
--:-- CET (UTC+1)

8 February 2004 23	Troyes	0–1	Saint-Étienne	Troyes
--:-- CET (UTC+1)				Stadium: Stade de l'Aube

14 February 2004 24	Istres	0–0	Troyes	Istres
--:-- CET (UTC+1)

21 February 2004 25	Troyes	2–2	Angers	Troyes
--:-- CET (UTC+1)				Stadium: Stade de l'Aube

16 April 2004 26	Niort	2–1	Troyes	Niort
--:-- CET (UTC+1)

6 March 2004 27	Troyes	2–1	Gueugnon	Troyes
--:-- CET (UTC+1)				Stadium: Stade de l'Aube

13 March 2004 28	Le Havre	3–0	Troyes	Le Havre
--:-- CET (UTC+1)

20 March 2004 29	Troyes	1–1	Nancy	Troyes
--:-- CET (UTC+1)				Stadium: Stade de l'Aube

27 March 2004 28	Châteauroux	1–1	Troyes	Châteauroux
--:-- CET (UTC+1)

3 April 2004 31	Troyes	0–1	Valence	Troyes
--:-- CEST (UTC+2)				Stadium: Stade de l'Aube

10 April 2004 32	Créteil	1–2	Troyes
--:-- CEST (UTC+2)

24 April 2004 33	Troyes	3–2	Amiens	Troyes
--:-- CEST (UTC+2)				Stadium: Stade de l'Aube

1 May 2004 34	Sedan	3–0	Troyes
--:-- CEST (UTC+2)

10 May 2004 35	Troyes	3–3	Lorient	Troyes
--:-- CEST (UTC+2)				Stadium: Stade de l'Aube

13 May 2004 36	Besançon	0–1	Troyes
--:-- CEST (UTC+2)

16 May 2004 37	Troyes	3–0	Rouen
--:-- CEST (UTC+2)

22 May 2004 38	Caen	3–0	Troyes	Troyes
--:-- CEST (UTC+2)				Stadium: Stade de l'Aube

=== Coupe de la Ligue ===
23 September 2003 First round	Troyes	2–0	Caen	Troyes
--:-- CEST (UTC+2)				Stadium: Stade de l'Aube
