= 2003–04 Besançon RC season =

Besançon RC
2003–04 season
- Head coach: Stéphane Paille
- Stadium: Stade Léo Lagrange
- Ligue 2: 19th (relegated)]
- Coupe de France: Round of 32
- Coupe de la Ligue: First round

The 2003–04 season was the 100th season in the existence of Besançon RC and the club's first season back in the second division of French football. In addition to the domestic league, Besançon RC participated in this season's editions of the Coupe de France and the Coupe de la Ligue.

== Pre-season and friendlies ==
Win Draw Loss

== Competitions ==
=== Overall record ===
Competition	First match	Last match	Starting round	Final position	Record							
Competition	First match	Last match	Starting round	Final position	Pld	W	D	L	GF	GA	GD	Win %
Ligue 2	2 August 2003	22 May 2004	Matchday 1	19th	38	8	14	16	37	45	−8	21.05
Coupe de France	22 November 2003	24 January 2004	Seventh round	Round of 32	4	3	0	1	8	4	+4	75.00
Coupe de la Ligue	23 September 2003		First round	First round	1	0	1	0	0	0	+0	0.00
Total					43	11	15	17	45	49	−4	25.58

Last updated: 22 May 2004
Source: Competitions

=== Ligue 2 ===
==== League table ====
Pos	Team	Pld	W	D	L	GF	GA	GD	Pts	Promotion or Relegation
16	Gueugnon	38	9	15	14	40	43	−3	42	
17	Laval	38	10	12	16	51	55	−4	42	
18	Valence (R)	38	9	13	16	45	56	−11	40	Relegation to Championnat National [fr]
19	Besançon (R)	38	8	14	16	37	45	−8	38	Relegation to Championnat National [fr]
20	Rouen (R)	38	5	14	19	27	50	−23	29	Relegation to Championnat National [fr]

Source: Ligue 2
(R) Relegated

==== Results summary ====
Overall								Home						Away					
Pld	W	D	L	GF	GA	GD	Pts	W	D	L	GF	GA	GD	W	D	L	GF	GA	GD
38	8	14	16	37	45	−8	38	5	8	6	24	19	+5	3	6	10	13	26	−13

Last updated: 22 May 2004.
Source: Ligue 2

==== Results by round ====
Round	1	2	3	4	5	6	7	8	9	10	11	12	13	14	15	16	17	18	19	20	21	22	23	24	25	26	27	28	29	30	31	32	33	34	35	36	37	38
Ground	A	H	A	H	A	H	A	H	A	H	A	H	A	H	A	A	H	A	H	A	H	A	H	A	H	A	H	A	H	A	H	A	H	H	A	H	A	H
Result	D	L	W	D	L	W	L	L	L	L	L	D	L	L	D	D	L	D	D	W	D	L	W	D	D	L	W	L	D	L	D	L	D	W	D	L	W	W
Position	11	16	9	9	12	8	13	16	17	19	19	20	20	20	20	20	20	20	20	19	19	20	19	17	17	19	17	18	17	18	18	19	19	19	19	19	19	19

Source: Ligue 2
A = Away; H = Home; W = Win; D = Draw; L = Loss

==== Matches ====
2 August 2003 1	Grenoble	0–0	Besançon
--:-- CEST (UTC+2)

9 August 2003 2	Besançon	0–1	Istres
--:-- CEST (UTC+2)

16 August 2003 3	Laval	1–3	Besançon
--:-- CEST (UTC+2)

19 August 2003 4	Besançon	1–1	Gueugnon
--:-- CEST (UTC+2)

23 August 2003 5	Angers	2–1	Besançon
--:-- CEST (UTC+2)

29 August 2003 6	Besançon	3–1	Châteauroux
--:-- CEST (UTC+2)

5 September 2003 7	Le Havre	2–0	Besançon
--:-- CEST (UTC+2)

13 September 2003 8	Besançon	0–1	Saint-Étienne
--:-- CEST (UTC+2)

20 September 2003 9	Niort	3–0	Besançon
--:-- CEST (UTC+2)

27 September 2003 10	Besançon	1–3	Nancy
--:-- CEST (UTC+2)

4 October 2003 11	Lorient	2–0	Besançon
--:-- CEST (UTC+2)

18 October 2003 12	Besançon	1–1	Valence
--:-- CEST (UTC+2)

25 October 2003 13	Sedan	2–0	Besançon
--:-- CEST (UTC+2)

31 October 2003 14	Besançon	0–2	Amiens
--:-- CET (UTC+1)

8 November 2003 15	Créteil	1–1	Besançon
--:-- CET (UTC+1)

29 November 2003 16	Rouen	1–1	Besançon
--:-- CET (UTC+1)

3 December 2003 17	Besançon	0–1	Caen
--:-- CET (UTC+1)

7 December 2003 18	Troyes	1–1	Besançon
--:-- CET (UTC+1)

20 December 2003 19	Besançon	1–1	Clermont
--:-- CET (UTC+1)

10 January 2004 20	Istres	0–1	Besançon
--:-- CET (UTC+1)

17 January 2004 21	Besançon	2–2	Laval
--:-- CET (UTC+1)

31 January 2004 22	Gueugnon	1–0	Besançon
--:-- CET (UTC+1)

7 February 2004 23	Besançon	2–0	Angers
--:-- CET (UTC+1)

14 February 2004 24	Châteauroux	0–0	Besançon
--:-- CET (UTC+1)

21 February 2004 25	Besançon	1–1	Le Havre
--:-- CET (UTC+1)

16 April 2004 26	Saint-Étienne	2–1	Besançon
--:-- CET (UTC+1)

6 March 2004 27	Besançon	4–0	Niort
--:-- CET (UTC+1)

13 March 2004 28	Nancy	3–0	Besançon
--:-- CET (UTC+1)

20 March 2004 29	Besançon	1–1	Lorient
--:-- CET (UTC+1)

27 March 2004 30	Valence	3–1	Besançon
--:-- CET (UTC+1)

3 April 2004 31	Besançon	1–1	Sedan
--:-- CEST (UTC+2)

10 April 2004 32	Amiens	1–0	Besançon
--:-- CEST (UTC+2)

24 April 2004 33	Besançon	0–0	Créteil
--:-- CEST (UTC+2)

1 May 2004 34	Besançon	3–0	Rouen
--:-- CEST (UTC+2)

8 May 2004 35	Caen	1–1	Besançon
--:-- CEST (UTC+2)

13 May 2004 36	Besançon	0–1	Troyes
--:-- CEST (UTC+2)

16 May 2004 37	Clermont	0–2	Besançon
--:-- CEST (UTC+2)

22 May 2004 38	Besançon	3–1	Grenoble
--:-- CEST (UTC+2)
