= 2003–04 Angers SCO season =

Angers SCO
2003–04 season
- Stadium: Stade Raymond Kopa
- Ligue 2: 13th
- Coupe de France: Round of 64
- Coupe de la Ligue: First round

The 2003–04 season was the 85th season in the existence of Angers SCO and the club's first season back in the second division of French football. In addition to the domestic league, Angers SCO participated in this season's editions of the Coupe de France and the Coupe de la Ligue.

== Pre-season and friendlies ==
Win Draw Loss

== Competitions ==
=== Overall record ===
Competition	First match	Last match	Starting round	Final position	Record							
Competition	First match	Last match	Starting round	Final position	Pld	W	D	L	GF	GA	GD	Win %
Ligue 2	2 August 2003	22 May 2004	Matchday 1	13th	38	11	12	15	36	43	−7	28.95
Coupe de France	22 November 2003	4 January 2004	Seventh round	Round of 64	3	2	1	0	4	0	+4	66.67
Coupe de la Ligue	23 September 2003		First round	First round	1	0	0	1	0	1	−1	0.00
Total					42	13	13	16	40	44	−4	30.95

Last updated: 22 May 2004
Source: Competitions

=== Ligue 2 ===
==== League table ====
Pos	Team	Pld	W	D	L	GF	GA	GD	Pts	Promotion or Relegation
11	Châteauroux	38	13	10	15	44	49	−5	49	Qualification for the UEFA Cup first round (Note: Since the Coupe de France winners Paris Saint-Germain qualified for the Champions League, their place in the UEFA Cup went to Châteauroux, who were the Coupe de France runners-up.)
12	Créteil	38	10	15	13	41	47	−6	45	
13	Angers	38	11	12	15	36	43	−7	45	
14	Clermont	38	9	17	12	36	48	−12	44	
15	Grenoble	38	9	16	13	38	43	−5	43	

Source: Ligue 2

==== Results summary ====
Overall								Home						Away					
Pld	W	D	L	GF	GA	GD	Pts	W	D	L	GF	GA	GD	W	D	L	GF	GA	GD
38	11	12	15	36	43	−7	45	9	6	4	23	14	+9	2	6	11	13	29	−16

Last updated: 22 May 2004.
Source: Ligue 2

==== Results by round ====
Round	1	2	3	4	5	6	7	8	9	10	11	12	13	14	15	16	17	18	19	20	21	22	23	24	25	26	27	28	29	30	31	32	33	34	35	36	37	38
Ground	H	A	H	A	H	A	H	A	H	A	H	H	A	H	A	H	A	H	A	H	A	H	A	H	A	H	A	H	A	A	H	A	H	A	H	A	H	A
Result	L	L	D	L	W	L	W	L	D	D	W	D	D	W	L	D	L	D	D	L	L	L	L	L	D	D	D	W	L	W	W	L	W	D	W	L	W	W
Position	17	20	20	20	19	20	17	18	18	18	15	15	15	13	14	14	15	14	15	15	16	18	18	19	19	18	18	17	18	16	16	16	16	16	15	16	15	13

Updated to match(es) played on 22 May 2004. Source: Ligue 2
A = Away; H = Home; W = Win; D = Draw; L = Loss

==== Matches ====
2 August 2003 1	Angers	0–2	Valence	Angers
20:00 CEST (UTC+2)		Report	Tchomogo 13' (pen.); Moreira 20'	Stadium: Stade Raymond Kopa; Attendance: 4,948; Referee: Didier Falcone

9 August 2003 2	Amiens	1–0	Angers	Amiens
20:00 CEST (UTC+2)	Leroy 53'	Report		Stadium: Stade de la Licorne; Attendance: 5,960; Referee: Serge Fidri

16 August 2003 3	Angers	0–0	Sedan	Angers
--:-- CEST (UTC+2)				Stadium: Stade Raymond Kopa

19 August 2003 4	Rouen	3–1	Angers
--:-- CEST (UTC+2)

23 August 2003 5	Angers	2–1	Besançon	Angers
--:-- CEST (UTC+2)				Stadium: Stade Raymond Kopa

30 August 2003 6	Caen	1–0	Angers
--:-- CEST (UTC+2)

5 September 2003 7	Angers	2–0	Troyes	Angers
--:-- CEST (UTC+2)				Stadium: Stade Raymond Kopa

13 September 2003 8	Clermont	4–1	Angers
--:-- CEST (UTC+2)

20 September 2003 9	Angers	1–1	Grenoble	Angers
--:-- CEST (UTC+2)				Stadium: Stade Raymond Kopa

27 September 2003 10	Laval	3–3	Angers
--:-- CEST (UTC+2)

4 October 2003 11	Angers	1–0	Istres	Angers
--:-- CEST (UTC+2)				Stadium: Stade Raymond Kopa

18 October 2003 12	Angers	0–0	Niort	Angers
--:-- CEST (UTC+2)				Stadium: Stade Raymond Kopa

25 October 2003 13	Gueugnon	1–1	Angers
--:-- CEST (UTC+2)

1 November 2003 14	Angers	2–0	Châteauroux	Angers
--:-- CET (UTC+1)				Stadium: Stade Raymond Kopa

8 November 2003 15	Le Havre	1–0	Angers
--:-- CET (UTC+1)

29 November 2003 16	Angers	1–1	Saint-Étienne	Angers
--:-- CET (UTC+1)				Stadium: Stade Raymond Kopa

3 December 2003 17	Nancy	2–1	Angers
--:-- CET (UTC+1)

7 December 2003 18	Angers	1–1	Lorient	Angers
--:-- CET (UTC+1)				Stadium: Stade Raymond Kopa

20 December 2003 19	Créteil	1–1	Angers
--:-- CET (UTC+1)

12 January 2004 20	Angers	1–2	Amiens	Angers
--:-- CET (UTC+1)				Stadium: Stade Raymond Kopa

17 January 2004 21	Sedan	1–0	Angers
--:-- CET (UTC+1)

31 January 2004 22	Angers	0–1	Rouen	Angers
--:-- CET (UTC+1)				Stadium: Stade Raymond Kopa

7 February 2004 23	Besançon	2–0	Angers
--:-- CET (UTC+1)

14 February 2004 24	Angers	0–1	Caen	Angers
--:-- CET (UTC+1)				Stadium: Stade Raymond Kopa

21 February 2004 25	Troyes	2–2	Angers
--:-- CET (UTC+1)

28 February 2004 26	Angers	0–0	Clermont	Angers
--:-- CET (UTC+1)				Stadium: Stade Raymond Kopa

6 March 2004 27	Grenoble	0–0	Angers
--:-- CET (UTC+1)

13 March 2004 28	Angers	3–2	Laval	Angers
--:-- CET (UTC+1)				Stadium: Stade Raymond Kopa

20 March 2004 29	Istres	1–0	Angers
--:-- CET (UTC+1)

27 March 2004 30	Niort	0–1	Angers
--:-- CET (UTC+1)

3 April 2004 31	Angers	2–1	Gueugnon	Angers
--:-- CEST (UTC+2)				Stadium: Stade Raymond Kopa

10 April 2004 32	Châteauroux	4–1	Angers
--:-- CEST (UTC+2)

24 April 2004 33	Angers	3–1	Le Havre	Angers
--:-- CEST (UTC+2)				Stadium: Stade Raymond Kopa

1 May 2004 34	Saint-Étienne	0–0	Angers
--:-- CEST (UTC+2)

8 May 2004 35	Angers	2–0	Nancy	Angers
--:-- CEST (UTC+2)				Stadium: Stade Raymond Kopa

13 May 2004 36	Lorient	2–0	Angers
--:-- CEST (UTC+2)

16 May 2004 37	Angers	2–0	Créteil	Angers
--:-- CEST (UTC+2)				Stadium: Stade Raymond Kopa

22 May 2004 38	Valence	0–1	Angers
--:-- CEST (UTC+2)

=== Coupe de la Ligue ===
23 September 2003 First round	Valence	1–0	Angers
--:-- CEST (UTC+2)
