= 2003–04 LB Châteauroux season =

LB Châteauroux
2003–04 season
- Stadium: Stade Gaston-Petit
- Ligue 2: 11th
- Coupe de France: Runners-up
- Coupe de la Ligue: First round

The 2003–04 season was the 88th season in the existence of LB Châteauroux and the club's sixth consecutive season in the second division of French football. In addition to the domestic league, LB Châteauroux participated in this season's editions of the Coupe de France and the Coupe de la Ligue.

== Pre-season and friendlies ==
Win Draw Loss

== Competitions ==
=== Overall record ===
Competition	First match	Last match	Starting round	Final position	Record							
Competition	First match	Last match	Starting round	Final position	Pld	W	D	L	GF	GA	GD	Win %
Ligue 2	2 August 2003	22 May 2004	Matchday 1	11th	38	13	10	15	44	49	−5	34.21
Coupe de France	4 January 2004	29 May 2004	Round of 64	Runners-up	6	4	1	1	8	3	+5	66.67
Coupe de la Ligue	23 September 2003		First round	First round	1	0	0	1	0	1	−1	0.00
Total					45	17	11	17	52	53	−1	37.78

Last updated: 22 May 2004
Source: Competitions

=== Ligue 2 ===
==== League table ====
Pos	Team	Pld	W	D	L	GF	GA	GD	Pts	Promotion or Relegation
9	Amiens	38	15	8	15	43	45	−2	53	
10	Troyes	38	13	13	12	43	48	−5	52	
11	Châteauroux	38	13	10	15	44	49	−5	49	Qualification for the UEFA Cup first round (Note: Since the Coupe de France winners Paris Saint-Germain qualified for the Champions League, their place in the UEFA Cup went to Châteauroux, who were the Coupe de France runners-up.)
12	Créteil	38	10	15	13	41	47	−6	45	
13	Angers	38	11	12	15	36	43	−7	45	

Source: Ligue 2

==== Results summary ====
Overall								Home						Away					
Pld	W	D	L	GF	GA	GD	Pts	W	D	L	GF	GA	GD	W	D	L	GF	GA	GD
38	13	10	15	44	49	−5	49	10	8	1	32	15	+17	3	2	14	12	34	−22

Last updated: 22 May 2004.
Source: Ligue 2

==== Results by round ====
Round	1	2	3	4	5	6	7	8	9	10	11	12	13	14	15	16	17	18	19	20	21	22	23	24	25	26	27	28	29	30	31	32	33	34	35	36	37	38
Ground	H	A	H	A	H	A	H	A	H	A	H	A	H	A	H	A	H	A	H	H	A	H	A	H	A	H	A	H	A	H	A	H	A	H	A	H	A	A
Result	W	L	D	L	D	L	L	D	D	W	D	L	W	L	D	D	W	L	W	W	L	W	W	D	L	W	L	W	L	D	L	W	W	D	L	W	L	L
Position	4	8	10	14	15	19	20	19	19	16	16	17	16	16	16	16	14	15	14	12	12	11	11	11	12	11	12	11	11	11	12	11	10	10	10	10	11	11

Source: Ligue 2
A = Away; H = Home; W = Win; D = Draw; L = Loss

==== Matches ====
2 August 2003 1	Châteauroux	2–0	Saint-Étienne
--:-- CEST (UTC+2)

9 August 2003 2	Valence	3–0	Châteauroux
--:-- CEST (UTC+2)

16 August 2003 3	Châteauroux	0–0	Nancy
--:-- CEST (UTC+2)

19 August 2003 4	Sedan	2–0	Châteauroux
--:-- CEST (UTC+2)

23 August 2003 5	Châteauroux	2–2	Lorient
--:-- CEST (UTC+2)

29 August 2003 6	Besançon	3–1	Châteauroux
--:-- CEST (UTC+2)

5 September 2003 7	Châteauroux	1–3	Créteil
--:-- CEST (UTC+2)

13 September 2003 8	Amiens	0–0	Châteauroux
--:-- CEST (UTC+2)

20 September 2003 9	Châteauroux	1–1	Caen
--:-- CEST (UTC+2)

27 September 2003 10	Rouen	1–4	Châteauroux
--:-- CEST (UTC+2)

4 October 2003 11	Châteauroux	0–0	Grenoble
--:-- CEST (UTC+2)

18 October 2003 12	Troyes	4–0	Châteauroux
--:-- CEST (UTC+2)

25 October 2003 13	Châteauroux	2–1	Laval
--:-- CEST (UTC+2)

1 November 2003 14	Angers	2–0	Châteauroux
--:-- CET (UTC+1)

8 November 2003 15	Châteauroux	2–2	Clermont
--:-- CET (UTC+1)

29 November 2003 16	Niort	0–0	Châteauroux
--:-- CET (UTC+1)

3 December 2003 17	Châteauroux	1–0	Istres
--:-- CET (UTC+1)

8 December 2003 18	Le Havre	3–2	Châteauroux
--:-- CET (UTC+1)

20 December 2003 19	Châteauroux	3–2	Gueugnon
--:-- CET (UTC+1)

10 January 2004 20	Châteauroux	3–0	Valence
--:-- CET (UTC+1)

17 January 2004 21	Nancy	2–0	Châteauroux
--:-- CET (UTC+1)

31 January 2004 22	Châteauroux	2–0	Sedan
--:-- CET (UTC+1)

7 February 2004 23	Lorient	0–1	Châteauroux
--:-- CET (UTC+1)

14 February 2004 24	Châteauroux	0–0	Besançon
--:-- CET (UTC+1)

21 February 2004 25	Créteil	1–0	Châteauroux
--:-- CET (UTC+1)

27 February 2004 26	Châteauroux	4–1	Amiens
--:-- CET (UTC+1)

6 March 2004 27	Caen	1–0	Châteauroux
--:-- CET (UTC+1)

13 March 2004 28	Châteauroux	2–0	Rouen
--:-- CET (UTC+1)

20 March 2004 29	Grenoble	4–1	Châteauroux
--:-- CET (UTC+1)

27 March 2004 28	Châteauroux	1–1	Troyes
--:-- CET (UTC+1)

3 April 2004 31	Laval	2–0	Châteauroux
--:-- CEST (UTC+2)

10 April 2004 32	Châteauroux	4–1	Angers
--:-- CEST (UTC+2)

23 April 2004 33	Clermont	0–1	Châteauroux
--:-- CEST (UTC+2)

1 May 2004 34	Châteauroux	0–0	Niort
--:-- CEST (UTC+2)

8 May 2004 35	Istres	2–1	Châteauroux
--:-- CEST (UTC+2)

12 May 2004 36	Châteauroux	2–1	Le Havre
--:-- CEST (UTC+2)

16 May 2004 37	Gueugnon	2–0	Châteauroux
--:-- CEST (UTC+2)

22 May 2004 38	Saint-Étienne	2–1	Châteauroux
--:-- CEST (UTC+2)

=== Coupe de France ===
24 January 2004 Round of 32	Valence	2–2 (a.e.t.) (4–5 p)	Châteauroux	Valence
20:00 CET (UTC+1)				Stadium: Stade Georges Pompidou; Attendance: 1,084; Referee: Bruno Ruffray

11 February 2004 Round of 16	Châteauroux	2–0	Créteil	Châteauroux
20:00 CET (UTC+1)				Stadium: Stade Gaston-Petit; Attendance: 5,801

17 March 2004 Quarter-finals	Monaco	0–1	Châteauroux	Monaco
21:00 CET (UTC+1)				Stadium: Stade Louis II; Attendance: 3,000

28 April 2004 Semi-finals	Châteauroux	2–0	Djion	Châteauroux
21:00 CEST (UTC+2)				Stadium: Stade Gaston-Petit; Attendance: 14,850

29 May 2004 Final	Paris Saint-Germain	1–0	Châteauroux	Saint-Denis
20:45 CEST (UTC+2)	Pauleta 65'			Stadium: Stade de France; Attendance: 78,721; Referee: Stéphane Bré
