= 2003–04 Stade Lavallois season =

Stade Lavallois
2003–04 season
- Stadium: Stade Francis Le Basser
- Ligue 2: 17th
- Coupe de France: Round of 64
- Coupe de la Ligue: First round

The 2003–04 season was the 102nd season in the existence of Stade Lavallois and the club's 11th consecutive season in the second division of French football. In addition to the domestic league, Stade Lavallois participated in this season's editions of the Coupe de France and the Coupe de la Ligue.

== Pre-season and friendlies ==
Win Draw Loss Fixtures

== Competitions ==
=== Overall record ===
Competition	First match	Last match	Starting round	Final position	Record							
Competition	First match	Last match	Starting round	Final position	Pld	W	D	L	GF	GA	GD	Win %
Ligue 2	2 August 2003	22 May 2004	Matchday 1	17th	38	10	12	16	51	55	−4	26.32
Coupe de France	22 November 2003	3 January 2004	Seventh round	Round of 64	3	2	0	1	5	4	+1	66.67
Coupe de la Ligue	24 September 2003	24 September 2003	First round	First round	1	0	0	1	0	2	−2	0.00
Total					42	12	12	18	56	61	−5	28.57

Last updated: May 2004
Source: Competitions

=== Ligue 2 ===
==== League table ====
Pos	Team	Pld	W	D	L	GF	GA	GD	Pts	Promotion or Relegation
15	Grenoble	38	9	16	13	38	43	−5	43	
16	Gueugnon	38	9	15	14	40	43	−3	42	
17	Laval	38	10	12	16	51	55	−4	42	
18	Valence (R)	38	9	13	16	45	56	−11	40	Relegation to Championnat National [fr]
19	Besançon (R)	38	8	14	16	37	45	−8	38	Relegation to Championnat National [fr]

Source: Ligue 2
(R) Relegated

==== Results summary ====
Overall								Home						Away					
Pld	W	D	L	GF	GA	GD	Pts	W	D	L	GF	GA	GD	W	D	L	GF	GA	GD
38	10	12	16	51	55	−4	42	8	6	5	31	20	+11	2	6	11	20	35	−15

Last updated: 22 May 2004.
Source: Ligue 2

==== Results by round ====
Round	1	2	3	4	5	6	7	8	9	10	11	12	13	14	15	16	17	18	19	20	21	22	23	24	25	26	27	28	29	30	31	32	33	34	35	36	37	38
Ground	H	A	H	A	H	A	H	H	A	H	A	H	A	H	A	H	A	H	A	H	A	H	A	H	A	A	H	A	H	A	H	A	H	A	H	A	H	A
Result	L	D	L	D	W	L	W	D	L	D	L	L	L	W	D	D	L	D	L	D	D	W	W	L	D	L	D	L	L	D	W	L	W	L	W	L	W	W
Position	16	14	19	18	14	17	15	14	15	15	18	19	19	17	17	17	17	17	18	18	18	16	16	16	16	16	16	16	16	17	17	17	17	18	17	17	17	17

Source: Ligue 2
A = Away; H = Home; W = Win; D = Draw; L = Loss

==== Matches ====
2 August 2003 1	Laval	1–2	Amiens
--:-- CEST (UTC+2)

9 August 2003 2	Rouen	1–1	Laval
--:-- CEST (UTC+2)

16 August 2003 3	Laval	1–3	Besançon
--:-- CEST (UTC+2)

19 August 2003 4	Troyes	0–0	Laval
--:-- CEST (UTC+2)

23 August 2003 5	Laval	1–0	Caen
--:-- CEST (UTC+2)

30 August 2003 6	Clermont	2–1	Laval
--:-- CEST (UTC+2)

4 September 2003 7	Laval	2–0	Grenoble
--:-- CEST (UTC+2)

13 September 2003 8	Laval	1–1	Le Havre
--:-- CEST (UTC+2)

20 September 2003 9	Istres	2–1	Laval
--:-- CEST (UTC+2)

27 September 2003 10	Laval	3–3	Angers
--:-- CEST (UTC+2)

4 October 2003 11	Niort	4–0	Laval
--:-- CEST (UTC+2)

18 October 2003 12	Laval	1–2	Gueugnon
--:-- CEST (UTC+2)

25 October 2003 13	Châteauroux	2–1	Laval
--:-- CEST (UTC+2)

1 November 2003 14	Laval	2–0	Saint-Étienne
--:-- CET (UTC+1)

8 November 2003 15	Nancy	1–1	Laval
--:-- CET (UTC+1)

28 November 2003 16	Laval	2–2	Lorient
--:-- CET (UTC+1)

3 December 2003 17	Créteil	3–0	Laval
--:-- CET (UTC+1)

6 December 2003 18	Laval	2–2	Valence
--:-- CET (UTC+1)

20 December 2003 19	Sedan	1–0	Laval
--:-- CET (UTC+1)

10 January 2004 20	Laval	0–0	Rouen
--:-- CET (UTC+1)

17 January 2004 21	Besançon	2–2	Laval
--:-- CET (UTC+1)

31 January 2004 22	Laval	4–0	Troyes
--:-- CET (UTC+1)

7 February 2004 23	Caen	1–2	Laval
--:-- CET (UTC+1)

14 February 2004 24	Laval	2–3	Clermont
--:-- CET (UTC+1)

21 February 2004 25	Grenoble	1–1	Laval
--:-- CET (UTC+1)

28 February 2004 26	Le Havre	3–2	Laval
--:-- CET (UTC+1)

8 March 2004 27	Laval	0–0	Istres
--:-- CET (UTC+1)

13 March 2004 28	Angers	3–2	Laval
--:-- CET (UTC+1)

20 March 2004 29	Laval	0–1	Niort
--:-- CET (UTC+1)

27 March 2004 30	Gueugnon	1–1	Laval
--:-- CET (UTC+1)

3 April 2004 31	Laval	2–0	Châteauroux
--:-- CEST (UTC+2)

11 April 2004 32	Saint-Étienne	2–0	Laval
--:-- CEST (UTC+2)

24 April 2004 33	Laval	2–0	Nancy
--:-- CEST (UTC+2)

1 May 2004 34	Lorient	1–0	Laval
--:-- CEST (UTC+2)

8 May 2004 35	Laval	3–1	Créteil
--:-- CEST (UTC+2)

12 May 2004 36	Valence	2–1	Laval
--:-- CEST (UTC+2)

16 May 2004 37	Laval	2–0	Sedan
--:-- CEST (UTC+2)

22 May 2004 38	Amiens	3–4	Laval
--:-- CEST (UTC+2)
