= 2003–04 Clermont Foot season =

Clermont Foot
2003–04 season
- Stadium: Stade Gabriel Montpied
- Ligue 2: 14th
- Coupe de France: Seventh round
- Coupe de la Ligue: Round of 16

The 2003–04 season was the 94th season in the existence of Clermont Foot and the club's second consecutive season in the second division of French football. In addition to the domestic league, Clermont Foot participated in this season's editions of the Coupe de France and the Coupe de la Ligue.

== Pre-season and friendlies ==
Win Draw Loss

== Competitions ==
=== Overall record ===
Competition	First match	Last match	Starting round	Final position	Record							
Competition	First match	Last match	Starting round	Final position	Pld	W	D	L	GF	GA	GD	Win %
Ligue 2	2 August 2003	22 May 2004	Matchday 1	14th	38	9	17	12	36	48	−12	23.68
Coupe de France	22 November 2003		Seventh round	Seventh round	1	0	0	1	0	1	−1	0.00
Coupe de la Ligue	23 September 2003	17 December 2003	First round	Round of 16	3	2	0	1	4	1	+3	66.67
Total					42	11	17	14	40	50	−10	26.19

Last updated: 22 May 2004
Source: Competitions

=== Ligue 2 ===
==== League table ====
Pos	Team	Pld	W	D	L	GF	GA	GD	Pts
12	Créteil	38	10	15	13	41	47	−6	45
13	Angers	38	11	12	15	36	43	−7	45
14	Clermont	38	9	17	12	36	48	−12	44
15	Grenoble	38	9	16	13	38	43	−5	43
16	Gueugnon	38	9	15	14	40	43	−3	42

Source: Ligue 2

==== Results summary ====
Overall								Home						Away					
Pld	W	D	L	GF	GA	GD	Pts	W	D	L	GF	GA	GD	W	D	L	GF	GA	GD
38	9	17	12	36	48	−12	44	5	6	8	16	22	−6	4	11	4	20	26	−6

Last updated: 22 May 2004.
Source: Ligue 2

==== Results by round ====
Round	1	2	3	4	5	6	7	8	9	10	11	12	13	14	15	16	17	18	19	20	21	22	23	24	25	26	27	28	29	30	31	32	33	34	35	36	37	38
Ground	H	A	H	H	A	H	A	H	A	H	A	H	A	H	A	H	A	H	A	H	A	A	H	A	H	A	H	A	H	A	H	A	H	A	H	A	H	A
Result	D	W	D	L	D	W	L	W	W	W	L	L	D	L	D	D	D	L	D	D	L	L	W	W	D	D	L	D	W	D	D	D	L	D	L	W	L	D
Position	11	7	7	11	10	5	11	5	4	3	4	7	8	10	11	11	12	12	12	12	13	14	13	13	13	11	12	11	11	11	13	13	13	13	14	13	14	14

Source: Ligue 2
A = Away; H = Home; W = Win; D = Draw; L = Loss

==== Matches ====
2 August 2003 1	Clermont	0–0	Rouen	Clermont-Ferrand
--:-- CEST (UTC+2)				Stadium: Stade Gabriel Montpied

9 August 2003 2	Caen	1–2	Clermont	Caen
--:-- CEST (UTC+2)

16 August 2003 3	Clermont	0–0	Troyes	Clermont-Ferrand
--:-- CEST (UTC+2)				Stadium: Stade Gabriel Montpied

19 August 2003 4	Clermont	0–1	Niort	Clermont-Ferrand
--:-- CEST (UTC+2)				Stadium: Stade Gabriel Montpied

23 August 2003 5	Grenoble	0–0	Clermont	Grenoble
--:-- CEST (UTC+2)

30 August 2003 6	Clermont	2–1	Laval
--:-- CEST (UTC+2)

5 September 2003 7	Istres	2–0	Clermont	Istres
--:-- CEST (UTC+2)

13 September 2003 8	Clermont	4–1	Angers	Clermont-Ferrand
--:-- CEST (UTC+2)				Stadium: Stade Gabriel Montpied

20 September 2003 9	Nancy	3–4	Clermont	Tomblaine
--:-- CEST (UTC+2)

27 September 2003 10	Clermont	1–0	Gueugnon	Clermont-Ferrand
--:-- CEST (UTC+2)				Stadium: Stade Gabriel Montpied

4 October 2003 11	Créteil	5–1	Clermont
--:-- CEST (UTC+2)

19 October 2003 12	Clermont	0–3	Saint-Étienne	Clermont-Ferrand
--:-- CEST (UTC+2)				Stadium: Stade Gabriel Montpied

25 October 2003 13	Le Havre	1–1	Clermont
--:-- CEST (UTC+2)

31 October 2003 14	Clermont	0–4	Lorient
--:-- CET (UTC+1)

8 November 2003 15	Châteauroux	2–2	Clermont
--:-- CET (UTC+1)

29 November 2003 16	Clermont	1–1	Valence
--:-- CET (UTC+1)

3 December 2003 17	Sedan	1–1	Clermont
--:-- CET (UTC+1)

6 December 2003 18	Clermont	0–2	Amiens
--:-- CET (UTC+1)

20 December 2003 19	Besançon	1–1	Clermont
--:-- CET (UTC+1)

10 January 2004 20	Clermont	2–2	Caen
--:-- CET (UTC+1)

17 January 2004 21	Troyes	2–0	Clermont
--:-- CET (UTC+1)

31 January 2004 22	Niort	3–1	Clermont
--:-- CET (UTC+1)

7 February 2004 23	Clermont	2–0	Grenoble
--:-- CET (UTC+1)

14 February 2004 24	Laval	2–3	Clermont
--:-- CET (UTC+1)

21 February 2004 25	Clermont	1–1	Istres
--:-- CET (UTC+1)

28 February 2004 26	Angers	0–0	Clermont
--:-- CET (UTC+1)

6 March 2004 27	Clermont	0–1	Nancy
--:-- CET (UTC+1)

13 March 2004 28	Gueugnon	0–0	Clermont
--:-- CET (UTC+1)

20 March 2004 29	Clermont	2–0	Créteil
--:-- CET (UTC+1)

27 March 2004 30	Saint-Étienne	0–0	Clermont
--:-- CET (UTC+1)

3 April 2004 31	Clermont	1–1	Le Havre	Clermont-Ferrand
--:-- CEST (UTC+2)				Stadium: Stade Gabriel Montpied

10 April 2004 32	Lorient	1–1	Clermont	Lorient
--:-- CEST (UTC+2)

23 April 2004 33	Clermont	0–1	Châteauroux	Clermont-Ferrand
--:-- CEST (UTC+2)				Stadium: Stade Gabriel Montpied

1 May 2004 34	Valence	1–1	Clermont	Valence
--:-- CEST (UTC+2)

8 May 2004 35	Clermont	0–1	Sedan	Clermont-Ferrand
--:-- CEST (UTC+2)				Stadium: Stade Gabriel Montpied

12 May 2004 36	Amiens	1–2	Clermont	Amiens
--:-- CEST (UTC+2)

16 May 2004 37	Clermont	0–2	Besançon	Clermont-Ferrand
--:-- CEST (UTC+2)				Stadium: Stade Gabriel Montpied

22 May 2004 38	Rouen	0–0	Clermont	Rouen
--:-- CEST (UTC+2)

=== Coupe de France ===
22 November 2003 Seventh round	ESA Brive	1–0	Clermont
--:-- CET (UTC+1)

=== Coupe de la Ligue ===
23 September 2003 First round	Clermont	3–0 (a.e.t.)	Niort	Clermont-Ferrand
--:-- CEST (UTC+2)				Stadium: Stade Gabriel Montpied

28 October 2003 Round of 32	Montpellier	0–1	Clermont	Montpellier
--:-- CET (UTC+1)

17 December 2003 Round of 16	Nantes	1–0	Clermont	Nantes
--:-- CET (UTC+1)
