= 2003–04 AS Nancy Lorraine season =

Nancy
2003–04 season
- Owner: Jacques Rousselot
- President: Jacques Rousselot
- Head coach: Pablo Correa
- Stadium: Stade Marcel Picot
- Ligue 2: 6th
- Coupe de France: Round of 32
- Coupe de la Ligue: Round of 32

The 2003–04 season was the 37th season in the existence of AS Nancy Lorraine and the club's fourth consecutive season in the second division of French football. In addition to the domestic league, AS Nancy Lorraine participated in this season's editions of the Coupe de France and the Coupe de la Ligue.

== Pre-season and friendlies ==
Win Draw Loss

== Competitions ==
=== Overall record ===
Competition	First match	Last match	Starting round	Final position	Record							
Competition	First match	Last match	Starting round	Final position	Pld	W	D	L	GF	GA	GD	Win %
Ligue 2	1 August 2003	22 May 2004	Matchday 1		38	14	13	11	45	36	+9	36.84
Coupe de France	22 November 2003	24 January 2004	Seventh round	Round of 32	4	2	1	1	9	6	+3	50.00
Coupe de la Ligue	24 September 2003	28 October 2003	First round	Round of 32	2	1	0	1	2	3	−1	50.00
Total					44	17	14	13	56	45	+11	38.64

Last updated: 22 May 2004
Source: Competitions

=== Ligue 2 ===
==== League table ====
Pos	Team	Pld	W	D	L	GF	GA	GD	Pts
4	Lorient	38	17	10	11	57	45	+12	61
5	Sedan	38	15	15	8	42	31	+11	60
6	Nancy	38	14	13	11	45	36	+9	55
7	Le Havre	38	15	10	13	44	46	−2	55
8	Niort	38	13	14	11	47	44	+3	53

Source: Ligue 2

==== Results summary ====
Overall								Home						Away					
Pld	W	D	L	GF	GA	GD	Pts	W	D	L	GF	GA	GD	W	D	L	GF	GA	GD
38	14	13	11	45	36	+9	55	10	5	4	29	16	+13	4	8	7	16	20	−4

Last updated: 22 May 2004.
Source: Ligue 2

==== Results by round ====
Round	1	2	3	4	5	6	7	8	9	10	11	12	13	14	15	16	17	18	19	20	21	22	23	24	25	26	27	28	29	30	31	32	33	34	35	36	37	38
Ground	A	H	A	A	H	A	H	A	H	A	H	A	H	A	H	A	H	A	H	A	H	H	A	H	A	H	A	H	A	H	A	H	A	H	A	H	A	H
Result	D	L	D	L	W	D	W	D	L	W	W	L	D	W	D	D	W	D	L	D	W	D	L	D	W	W	W	W	D	W	L	D	L	L	L	W	L	W
Position	10	15	14	19	13	14	10	13	14	10	7	9	9	7	7	7	7	8	9	10	10	9	10	10	9	8	7	7	7	5	7	7	7	8	9	7	8	6

Source: Ligue 2
A = Away; H = Home; W = Win; D = Draw; L = Loss

==== Matches ====
1 August 2003 1	Le Havre	0–0	Nancy
--:-- CEST (UTC+2)

9 August 2003 2	Nancy	0–1	Saint-Étienne
--:-- CEST (UTC+2)

16 August 2003 3	Châteauroux	0–0	Nancy
--:-- CEST (UTC+2)

19 August 2003 4	Lorient	2–0	Nancy
--:-- CEST (UTC+2)

23 August 2003 5	Nancy	2–0	Créteil
--:-- CEST (UTC+2)

30 August 2003 6	Valence	0–0	Nancy
--:-- CEST (UTC+2)

5 September 2003 7	Nancy	2–0	Sedan
--:-- CEST (UTC+2)

13 September 2003 8	Rouen	1–1	Nancy
--:-- CEST (UTC+2)

20 September 2003 9	Nancy	3–4	Clermont
--:-- CEST (UTC+2)

27 September 2003 10	Besançon	1–3	Nancy
--:-- CEST (UTC+2)

4 October 2003 11	Nancy	3–0	Troyes
--:-- CEST (UTC+2)

18 October 2003 12	Istres	2–0	Nancy
--:-- CEST (UTC+2)

25 October 2003 13	Nancy	0–0	Amiens
--:-- CEST (UTC+2)

1 November 2003 14	Grenoble	2–3	Nancy
--:-- CET (UTC+1)

8 November 2003 15	Nancy	1–1	Laval
--:-- CET (UTC+1)

29 November 2003 16	Gueugnon	0–0	Nancy
--:-- CET (UTC+1)

3 December 2003 17	Nancy	2–1	Angers
--:-- CET (UTC+1)

6 December 2003 18	Niort	2–2	Nancy
--:-- CET (UTC+1)

20 December 2003 19	Nancy	0–2	Caen
--:-- CET (UTC+1)

10 January 2004 20	Saint-Étienne	0–0	Nancy
--:-- CET (UTC+1)

17 January 2004 21	Nancy	2–0	Châteauroux
--:-- CET (UTC+1)

2 February 2004 22	Nancy	1–1	Lorient
--:-- CET (UTC+1)

7 February 2004 23	Créteil	1–0	Nancy
--:-- CET (UTC+1)

14 February 2004 24	Nancy	1–1	Valence
--:-- CET (UTC+1)

21 February 2004 25	Sedan	0–4	Nancy
--:-- CET (UTC+1)

28 February 2004 26	Nancy	2–1	Rouen
--:-- CET (UTC+1)

6 March 2004 27	Clermont	0–1	Nancy
--:-- CET (UTC+1)

13 March 2004 28	Nancy	3–0	Besançon
--:-- CET (UTC+1)

20 March 2004 29	Troyes	1–1	Nancy
--:-- CET (UTC+1)

28 March 2004 30	Nancy	2–1	Istres
--:-- CEST (UTC+2)

3 April 2004 31	Amiens	2–1	Nancy
--:-- CEST (UTC+2)

10 April 2004 32	Nancy	0–0	Grenoble
--:-- CEST (UTC+2)

24 April 2004 33	Laval	2–0	Nancy
--:-- CEST (UTC+2)

1 May 2004 34	Nancy	0–2	Gueugnon
--:-- CEST (UTC+2)

8 May 2004 35	Angers	2–0	Nancy
--:-- CEST (UTC+2)

12 May 2004 36	Nancy	1–0	Niort
--:-- CEST (UTC+2)

16 May 2004 37	Caen	2–0	Nancy
--:-- CEST (UTC+2)

22 May 2004 38	Nancy	4–1	Le Havre
--:-- CEST (UTC+2)
