= 2003–04 FC Istres season =

FC Istres
2003–04 season
- Stadium: Stade Bernard Bardin
- Ligue 2: 3rd (promoted)
- Coupe de France: Eighth round
- Coupe de la Ligue: Round of 32

The 2003–04 season was the 85th season in the existence of FC Istres and the club's third consecutive season in the second division of French football. In addition to the domestic league, FC Istres participated in this season's editions of the Coupe de France and the Coupe de la Ligue.

== Pre-season and friendlies ==
Win Draw Loss Fixtures

== Competitions ==
=== Overall record ===
Competition	First match	Last match	Starting round	Final position	Record							
Competition	First match	Last match	Starting round	Final position	Pld	W	D	L	GF	GA	GD	Win %
Ligue 2	2 August 2003	22 May 2004	Matchday 1	3rd	38	19	9	10	0	0	+0	50.00
Coupe de France	23 November 2003	12 December 2003	Seventh round	Eighth round	2	1	1	0	3	1	+2	50.00
Coupe de la Ligue	23 September 2003	29 October 2003	First round	Round of 32	2	1	0	1	2	2	+0	50.00
Total					42	21	10	11	5	3	+2	50.00

Last updated: May 2004
Source: Competitions

=== Ligue 2 ===
==== League table ====
Pos	Team	Pld	W	D	L	GF	GA	GD	Pts	Promotion or Relegation
1	Saint-Étienne (C, P)	38	22	7	9	44	29	+15	73	Promotion to Ligue 1
2	Caen (P)	38	20	11	7	56	31	+25	71	Promotion to Ligue 1
3	Istres (P)	38	19	9	10	44	26	+18	66	Promotion to Ligue 1
4	Lorient	38	17	10	11	57	45	+12	61	
5	Sedan	38	15	15	8	42	31	+11	60	

Source: Ligue 2
(C) Champions; (P) Promoted

==== Results summary ====
Overall								Home						Away					
Pld	W	D	L	GF	GA	GD	Pts	W	D	L	GF	GA	GD	W	D	L	GF	GA	GD
38	19	9	10	44	26	+18	66	14	3	2	29	10	+19	5	6	8	15	16	−1

Last updated: 22 May 2004.
Source: Ligue 2

==== Results by round ====
Round	1	2	3	4	5	6	7	8	9	10	11	12	13	14	15	16	17	18	19	20	21	22	23	24	25	26	27	28	29	30	31	32	33	34	35	36	37	38
Ground	H	A	H	A	H	A	H	A	H	H	A	H	A	H	A	H	A	H	A	H	A	H	A	H	A	H	A	A	H	A	H	A	H	A	H	A	H	A
Result	W	W	W	D	D	W	W	W	W	W	L	W	L	W	D	W	L	W	D	L	L	W	W	D	D	W	D	L	W	L	D	L	L	D	W	W	W	L
Position	3	2	1	2	2	1	1	1	1	1	1	1	1	1	1	1	1	1	1	1	1	1	1	1	1	1	1	2	2	2	2	2	3	3	3	3	3	3

Source: Ligue 2
A = Away; H = Home; W = Win; D = Draw; L = Loss

==== Matches ====
2 August 2003 1	Istres	2–0	Sedan
--:-- CEST (UTC+2)

9 August 2003 2	Besançon	0–1	Istres
--:-- CEST (UTC+2)

16 August 2003 3	Istres	3–1	Caen
--:-- CEST (UTC+2)

19 August 2003 4	Amiens	0–0	Istres
--:-- CEST (UTC+2)

23 August 2003 5	Istres	0–0	Rouen
--:-- CEST (UTC+2)

30 August 2003 6	Troyes	0–2	Istres
--:-- CEST (UTC+2)

5 September 2003 7	Istres	2–0	Clermont
--:-- CEST (UTC+2)

13 September 2003 8	Grenoble	0–1	Istres
--:-- CEST (UTC+2)

20 September 2003 9	Istres	2–1	Laval
--:-- CEST (UTC+2)

28 September 2003 10	Istres	1–0	Lorient
--:-- CEST (UTC+2)

4 October 2003 11	Angers	1–0	Istres
--:-- CEST (UTC+2)

18 October 2003 12	Istres	2–0	Nancy
--:-- CEST (UTC+2)

26 October 2003 13	Niort	2–1	Istres
--:-- CEST (UTC+2)

1 November 2003 14	Istres	2–1	Gueugnon
--:-- CET (UTC+1)

7 November 2003 15	Saint-Étienne	0–0	Istres
--:-- CET (UTC+1)

29 November 2003 16	Istres	2–0	Le Havre
--:-- CET (UTC+1)

3 December 2003 17	Châteauroux	1–0	Istres
--:-- CET (UTC+1)

7 December 2003 18	Istres	2–0	Créteil
--:-- CET (UTC+1)

20 December 2003 19	Valence	0–0	Istres
--:-- CET (UTC+1)

10 January 2004 20	Istres	0–1	Besançon
--:-- CET (UTC+1)

17 January 2004 21	Caen	2–1	Istres
--:-- CET (UTC+1)

1 February 2004 22	Istres	1–0	Amiens
--:-- CET (UTC+1)

7 February 2004 23	Rouen	1–3	Istres
--:-- CET (UTC+1)

14 February 2004 24	Istres	0–0	Troyes
--:-- CET (UTC+1)

21 February 2004 25	Clermont	1–1	Istres
--:-- CET (UTC+1)

28 February 2004 26	Istres	2–0	Grenoble
--:-- CET (UTC+1)

8 March 2004 27	Laval	0–0	Istres
--:-- CET (UTC+1)

13 March 2004 28	Lorient	2–1	Istres
--:-- CET (UTC+1)

20 March 2004 29	Istres	1–0	Angers
--:-- CET (UTC+1)

28 March 2004 30	Nancy	2–1	Istres
--:-- CEST (UTC+2)

5 April 2004 31	Istres	2–2	Niort
--:-- CEST (UTC+2)

10 April 2004 32	Gueugnon	1–0	Istres
--:-- CEST (UTC+2)

23 April 2004 33	Istres	0–2	Saint-Étienne
--:-- CEST (UTC+2)

1 May 2004 34	Le Havre	0–0	Istres
--:-- CEST (UTC+2)

8 May 2004 35	Istres	2–1	Châteauroux
--:-- CEST (UTC+2)

12 May 2004 36	Créteil	0–2	Istres
--:-- CEST (UTC+2)

16 May 2004 37	Istres	3–1	Valence
--:-- CEST (UTC+2)

22 May 2004 38	Sedan	3–1	Istres
--:-- CEST (UTC+2)
