= 2003–04 Grenoble Foot 38 season =

Grenoble Foot 38
2003–04 season
- Head coach: Alain Michel
- Stadium: Stade Lesdiguières
- Ligue 2: 15th
- Coupe de France: Round of 64
- Coupe de la Ligue: First round

The 2003–04 season was the 112th season in the existence of Grenoble Foot 38 and the club's third consecutive season in the second division of French football. In addition to the domestic league, Grenoble Foot 38 participated in this season's editions of the Coupe de France and the Coupe de la Ligue.

== Pre-season and friendlies ==
Win Draw Loss

== Competitions ==
=== Overall record ===
| Competition | First match | Last match | Starting round | Final position | Record | | | | | | | |
| Competition | First match | Last match | Starting round | Final position | Pld | W | D | L | GF | GA | GD | Win % |
|---|---|---|---|---|---|---|---|---|---|---|---|---|
| Ligue 2 | 2 August 2003 | 22 May 2004 | Matchday 1 | 15th | 38 | 9 | 16 | 13 | 38 | 43 | −5 | 23.68 |
| Coupe de France | 23 November 2003 | 4 January 2004 | Seventh round | Round of 64 | 3 | 2 | 0 | 1 | 7 | 1 | +6 | 66.67 |
| Coupe de la Ligue | 23 September 2003 | | First round | First round | 1 | 0 | 0 | 1 | 0 | 1 | −1 | 0.00 |
| Total | | | | | 42 | 11 | 16 | 15 | 45 | 45 | +0 | 26.19 |

Last updated: 22 May 2004
Source: Competitions

=== Ligue 2 ===
==== League table ====
| Pos | Team | Pld | W | D | L | GF | GA | GD | Pts |
|---|---|---|---|---|---|---|---|---|---|
| 13 | Angers | 38 | 11 | 12 | 15 | 36 | 43 | −7 | 45 |
| 14 | Clermont | 38 | 9 | 17 | 12 | 36 | 48 | −12 | 44 |
| 15 | Grenoble | 38 | 9 | 16 | 13 | 38 | 43 | −5 | 43 |
| 16 | Gueugnon | 38 | 9 | 15 | 14 | 40 | 43 | −3 | 42 |
| 17 | Laval | 38 | 10 | 12 | 16 | 51 | 55 | −4 | 42 |

Source: Ligue 2

==== Results summary ====
| Overall | | | | | | | | Home | | | | | | Away | | | | | |
| Pld | W | D | L | GF | GA | GD | Pts | W | D | L | GF | GA | GD | W | D | L | GF | GA | GD |
|---|---|---|---|---|---|---|---|---|---|---|---|---|---|---|---|---|---|---|---|
| 38 | 9 | 16 | 13 | 38 | 43 | −5 | 43 | 5 | 10 | 4 | 23 | 19 | +4 | 4 | 6 | 9 | 15 | 24 | −9 |

Last updated: 22 May 2004.
Source: Ligue 2

==== Results by round ====
| Round | 1 | 2 | 3 | 4 | 5 | 6 | 7 | 8 | 9 | 10 | 11 | 12 | 13 | 14 | 15 | 16 | 17 | 18 | 19 | 20 | 21 | 22 | 23 | 24 | 25 | 26 | 27 | 28 | 29 | 30 | 31 | 32 | 33 | 34 | 35 | 36 | 37 | 38 |
|---|---|---|---|---|---|---|---|---|---|---|---|---|---|---|---|---|---|---|---|---|---|---|---|---|---|---|---|---|---|---|---|---|---|---|---|---|---|---|
| Ground | H | A | H | A | H | H | A | H | A | H | A | H | A | H | A | H | A | H | A | H | A | H | A | A | H | A | H | A | H | A | H | A | H | A | H | A | H | A |
| Result | D | L | D | D | D | D | L | L | D | L | D | W | L | L | L | D | W | D | W | L | W | W | L | W | D | L | D | D | W | L | D | D | D | D | W | L | W | L |
| Position | 13 | 13 | 13 | 16 | 18 | 15 | 18 | 20 | 20 | 20 | 20 | 18 | 18 | 19 | 19 | 19 | 18 | 18 | 16 | 16 | 15 | 13 | 15 | 14 | 14 | 14 | 14 | 14 | 14 | 14 | 15 | 14 | 14 | 14 | 13 | 14 | 13 | 15 |

Source: Ligue 2
A = Away; H = Home; W = Win; D = Draw; L = Loss

==== Matches ====
| 2 August 2003 1 | Grenoble | 0–0 | Besançon |
| --:-- CEST (UTC+2) |

| 9 August 2003 2 | Troyes | 3–2 | Grenoble |
| --:-- CEST (UTC+2) |

| 16 August 2003 3 | Grenoble | 0–0 | Rouen |
| --:-- CEST (UTC+2) |

| 19 August 2003 4 | Caen | 0–0 | Grenoble |
| --:-- CEST (UTC+2) |

| 23 August 2003 5 | Grenoble | 0–0 | Clermont |
| --:-- CEST (UTC+2) |

| 30 August 2003 6 | Grenoble | 2–2 | Gueugnon |
| --:-- CEST (UTC+2) |

| 4 September 2003 7 | Laval | 2–0 | Grenoble |
| --:-- CEST (UTC+2) |

| 13 September 2003 8 | Grenoble | 0–1 | Istres |
| --:-- CEST (UTC+2) |

| 20 September 2003 9 | Angers | 1–1 | Grenoble |
| --:-- CEST (UTC+2) |

| 27 September 2003 10 | Grenoble | 0–1 | Niort |
| --:-- CEST (UTC+2) |

| 4 October 2003 11 | Châteauroux | 0–0 | Grenoble |
| --:-- CEST (UTC+2) |

| 18 October 2003 12 | Grenoble | 2–0 | Le Havre |
| --:-- CEST (UTC+2) |

| 25 October 2003 13 | Saint-Étienne | 1–0 | Grenoble |
| --:-- CEST (UTC+2) |

| 1 November 2003 14 | Grenoble | 2–3 | Nancy |
| --:-- CET (UTC+1) |

| 8 November 2003 15 | Lorient | 2–1 | Grenoble |
| --:-- CET (UTC+1) |

| 29 November 2003 16 | Grenoble | 1–1 | Créteil |
| --:-- CET (UTC+1) |

| 17 December 2003 17 | Valence | 1–2 | Grenoble |
| --:-- CET (UTC+1) |

| 6 December 2003 18 | Grenoble | 0–0 | Sedan |
| --:-- CET (UTC+1) |

| 20 December 2003 19 | Amiens | 0–1 | Grenoble |
| --:-- CET (UTC+1) |

| 10 January 2004 20 | Grenoble | 1–2 | Troyes |
| --:-- CET (UTC+1) |

| 17 January 2004 21 | Rouen | 0–2 | Grenoble |
| --:-- CET (UTC+1) |

| 31 January 2004 22 | Grenoble | 2–1 | Caen |
| --:-- CET (UTC+1) |

| 7 February 2004 23 | Clermont | 2–0 | Grenoble |
| --:-- CET (UTC+1) |

| 14 February 2004 24 | Gueugnon | 0–2 | Grenoble |
| --:-- CET (UTC+1) |

| 21 February 2004 25 | Grenoble | 1–1 | Laval |
| --:-- CET (UTC+1) |

| 28 February 2004 26 | Istres | 2–0 | Grenoble |
| --:-- CET (UTC+1) |

| 6 March 2004 27 | Grenoble | 0–0 | Angers |
| --:-- CET (UTC+1) |

| 13 March 2004 28 | Niort | 1–1 | Grenoble |
| --:-- CET (UTC+1) |

| 20 March 2004 29 | Grenoble | 4–1 | Châteauroux |
| --:-- CET (UTC+1) |

| 27 March 2004 30 | Le Havre | 1–0 | Grenoble |
| --:-- CET (UTC+1) |

| 2 April 2004 31 | Grenoble | 2–2 | Saint-Étienne |
| --:-- CEST (UTC+2) |

| 10 April 2004 32 | Nancy | 0–0 | Grenoble |
| --:-- CEST (UTC+2) |

| 24 April 2004 33 | Grenoble | 1–1 | Lorient |
| --:-- CEST (UTC+2) |

| 1 May 2004 34 | Créteil | 1–1 | Grenoble |
| --:-- CEST (UTC+2) |

| 8 May 2004 35 | Grenoble | 4–3 | Valence |
| --:-- CEST (UTC+2) |

| 12 May 2004 36 | Sedan | 4–1 | Grenoble |
| --:-- CEST (UTC+2) |

| 16 May 2004 37 | Grenoble | 1–0 | Amiens |
| --:-- CEST (UTC+2) |

| 22 May 2004 38 | Besançon | 3–1 | Grenoble |
| --:-- CEST (UTC+2) |
