= 2003–04 FC Metz season =

Metz
2003–04 season
- President: Charles Molinari
- Head coach: Jean Fernandez
- Ligue 1: 14th
- Coupe de France: Round of 64
- Coupe de la Ligue: Round of 16
- Top goalscorer: League: Toifilou Maoulida (12); All: Toifilou Maoulida (13)
- Average home league attendance: 18,052
- Biggest win: Metz 5–0 Le Mans

The 2003–04 FC Metz season was the club's 72nd season in existence and the club's first season back in the top flight of French football after one season of absence. In addition to the domestic league, Metz participated in this season's editions of the Coupe de France, and the Coupe de la Ligue. The season covered the period from 1 July 2003 to 30 June 2004.

== Competitions ==
=== Overview ===
Competition	First match	Last match	Starting round	Final position	Record							
Competition	First match	Last match	Starting round	Final position	Pld	W	D	L	GF	GA	GD	Win %
Ligue 1	2 August 2003	23 May 2004	Matchday 1	14th	38	11	9	18	34	42	−8	28.95
Coupe de France	4 January 2004		Round of 64	Round of 64	1	0	0	1	0	2	−2	0.00
Coupe de la Ligue	28 October 2003	17 December 2003	Round of 32	Round of 16	2	1	0	1	3	1	+2	50.00
Total					41	12	9	20	37	45	−8	29.27

Source: Competitions

=== Ligue 1 ===
==== League table ====
Pos	Team	Pld	W	D	L	GF	GA	GD	Pts
12	Bordeaux	38	13	11	14	40	43	−3	50
13	Strasbourg	38	10	13	15	43	50	−7	43
14	Metz	38	11	9	18	34	42	−8	42
15	Ajaccio	38	10	10	18	33	55	−22	40
16	Toulouse	38	9	12	17	31	44	−13	39

Source: Ligue 1
Rules for classification: 1) points; 2) goal difference; 3) number of goals scored.

==== Results summary ====
Overall								Home						Away					
Pld	W	D	L	GF	GA	GD	Pts	W	D	L	GF	GA	GD	W	D	L	GF	GA	GD
38	11	9	18	34	42	−8	42	6	3	10	18	22	−4	5	6	8	16	20	−4

Source: Ligue 1

==== Results by round ====
Round	1	2	3	4	5	6	7	8	9	10	11	12	13	14	15	16	17	18	19	20	21	22	23	24	25	26	27	28	29	30	31	32	33	34	35	36	37	38
Ground	H	A	H	A	A	H	A	H	A	H	A	H	A	H	A	H	A	H	A	H	A	H	H	A	H	A	H	A	H	A	H	A	H	A	H	A	H	A
Result	L	W	L	D	L	W	L	D	W	L	W	L	L	L	D	D	L	D	L	W	D	L	L	W	L	D	L	D	W	L	W	L	W	W	L	D	W	L
Position	17	10	14	12	16	12	15	16	14	15	13	14	15	15	16	17	17	16	17	17	17	17	17	15	15	16	17	18	16	18	16	16	16	13	15	14	13	14

Source: Ligue 1
A = Away; H = Home; W = Win; D = Draw; L = Loss

==== Matches ====
Win Draw Loss

2 August 2003 1	Metz	0–1	Ajaccio	Metz
CET (UTC+1)				Stadium: Stade Saint-Symphorien

9 August 2003 2	Bastia	0–2	Metz	Furiani
CET (UTC+1)				Stadium: Stade Armand Cesari

16 August 2003 3	Metz	0–1	Paris Saint-Germain	Metz
CET (UTC+1)				Stadium: Stade Saint-Symphorien

23 August 2003 4	Lille	1–1	Metz	Villeneuve d'Ascq
CET (UTC+1)				Stadium: Stadium Lille Métropole

31 August 2003 5	Monaco	1–0	Metz	Monaco
CET (UTC+1)				Stadium: Stade Louis II

13 September 2003 6	Metz	2–1	Montpellier	Metz
CET (UTC+1)				Stadium: Stade Saint-Symphorien

20 September 2003 7	Toulouse	1–0	Metz	Toulouse
CET (UTC+1)				Stadium: Stadium de Toulouse

27 September 2003 8	Metz	1–1	Guingamp	Metz
CET (UTC+1)				Stadium: Stade Saint-Symphorien

4 October 2003 9	Lens	0–2	Metz	Lens
CET (UTC+1)				Stadium: Stade Félix-Bollaert

18 October 2003 10	Metz	1–3	Nantes	Metz
CET (UTC+1)				Stadium: Stade Saint-Symphorien

25 October 2003 11	Strasbourg	0–2	Metz	Strasbourg
CET (UTC+1)				Stadium: Stade de la Meinau

1 November 2003 12	Metz	0–1	Sochaux	Metz
CET (UTC+1)				Stadium: Stade Saint-Symphorien

8 November 2003 13	Le Mans	2–0	Metz	Le Mans
CET (UTC+1)				Stadium: MMArena

22 November 2003 14	Metz	0–2	Auxerre	Metz
CET (UTC+1)				Stadium: Stade Saint-Symphorien

29 November 2003 15	Nice	1–1	Metz	Nice
CET (UTC+1)				Stadium: Stade du Ray

5 December 2003 17	Lyon	2–1	Metz	Lyon
CET (UTC+1)				Stadium: Stade de Gerland

13 December 2003 18	Metz	1–1	Rennes	Metz
CET (UTC+1)				Stadium: Stade Saint-Symphorien

20 December 2003 19	Bordeaux	2–0	Metz	Bordeaux
CET (UTC+1)				Stadium: Stade Chaban-Delmas

10 January 2004 20	Metz	1–0	Bastia	Metz
CET (UTC+1)				Stadium: Stade Saint-Symphorien

17 January 2004 21	Paris Saint-Germain	0–0	Metz	Paris
CET (UTC+1)				Stadium: Parc des Princes

27 January 2004 16	Metz	1–1	Marseille	Metz
CET (UTC+1)				Stadium: Stade Saint-Symphorien

31 January 2004 22	Metz	0–1	Lille	Metz
CET (UTC+1)				Stadium: Stade Saint-Symphorien

7 February 2004 23	Metz	0–2	Monaco	Metz
CET (UTC+1)				Stadium: Stade Saint-Symphorien

14 February 2004 24	Montpellier	0–1	Metz	Montpellier
CET (UTC+1)				Stadium: Stade de la Mosson

21 February 2004 25	Metz	0–2	Toulouse	Metz
CET (UTC+1)				Stadium: Stade Saint-Symphorien

6 March 2004 27	Metz	0–2	Lens	Metz
CET (UTC+1)				Stadium: Stade Saint-Symphorien

13 March 2004 28	Nantes	2–2	Metz	Nantes
CET (UTC+1)				Stadium: Stade de la Beaujoire

20 March 2004 29	Metz	1–0	Strasbourg	Metz
CET (UTC+1)				Stadium: Stade Saint-Symphorien

27 March 2004 30	Sochaux	2–0	Metz	Montbéliard
CET (UTC+1)				Stadium: Stade Auguste Bonal

3 April 2004 31	Metz	5–0	Le Mans	Metz
CET (UTC+1)				Stadium: Stade Saint-Symphorien

10 April 2004 32	Auxerre	2–1	Metz	Auxerre
CET (UTC+1)				Stadium: Stade de l'Abbé-Deschamps

16 April 2004 26	Guingamp	1–1	Metz	Montpellier
CET (UTC+1)				Stadium: Stade du Roudourou

24 April 2004 33	Metz	1–0	Nice	Metz
CET (UTC+1)				Stadium: Stade Saint-Symphorien

1 May 2004 34	Marseille	0–1	Metz	Marseille
CET (UTC+1)				Stadium: Stade Vélodrome

8 May 2004 35	Metz	1–2	Lyon	Metz
CET (UTC+1)				Stadium: Stade Saint-Symphorien; Referee: Bertrand Layec

12 May 2004 36	Rennes	0–0	Metz	Rennes
CET (UTC+1)				Stadium: Stade de la Route de Lorient

15 May 2004 37	Metz	3–1	Bordeaux	Metz
CET (UTC+1)				Stadium: Stade Saint-Symphorien

23 May 2004 38	Ajaccio	3–1	Metz	Ajaccio
CET (UTC+1)				Stadium: Stade François Coty

=== Coupe de France ===
4 January 2004 Round of 64	Metz	0–2	Monaco	Metz
18:00 CET (UTC+1)			Zikos 60'; Giuly 86'	Stadium: Stade Saint-Symphorien; Attendance: 7,076; Referee: Laurent Duhamel

=== Coupe de la Ligue ===
28 October 2003 Round of 32	Metz	3–0	Guingamp	Metz
20:00 CET (UTC+1)	Moreno 23' (pen.); Maoulida 39' (pen.); Borbiconi 81'			Stadium: Stade Saint-Symphorien; Attendance: 10,286; Referee: Olivier Thual

17 December 2003 Round of 16	Nice	1–0	Metz	Nice
19:00 CET (UTC+1)	Meslin 78'			Stadium: Stade du Ray; Attendance: 7,026; Referee: Damien Ledentu
