= Marc-Éric Gueï =

Ivorian footballer (born 1980)

Personal information
- Full name: Marc-Éric Gueï
- Date of birth: 28 July 1980 (age 46)
- Place of birth: Kontrou, Ivory Coast
- Height: 1.72 m (5 ft 8 in)
- Position: Striker

Senior career*
Years	Team	Apps	(Gls)
1998–2003	Montpellier	25	(3)
2000–2001	→ ASOA Valence (loan)	34	(15)
2001–2002	→ AS Beauvais (loan)	32	(10)
2003–2004	Châteauroux	36	(12)
2004–2006	Sedan	4	(0)
2005–2006	→ Gueugnon (loan)	13	(2)
2006–2007	Toulon	33	(10)
2007	Dubai Club	12	(11)
2008–2009	KV Oostende	29	(18)
2009–2010	Ethnikos Asteras	37	(21)
2010–2011	OFI	16	(6)
2011	Panetolikos	5	(0)
2011	Panserraikos	2	(0)
2013	US Bénédictine		

International career
2002	Ivory Coast	1	(0)
- * Club domestic league appearances and goals

Marc-Éric Gueï (born 28 July 1980) is an Ivorian former professional footballer who played as a striker. He mostly played for French and Greek clubs.

He acquired French nationality by naturalization on 31 August 2005.

== Career ==
In July 2007, Gueï began a two-week trial with Scottish side Dundee United.

== Honours ==
Montpellier

- UEFA Intertoto Cup: 1999

Châteauroux

- Coupe de France runner-up: 2003–04
