= Kelly Berville =

French footballer (born 1978)

Personal information
- Full name: Kelly Mathurin Berville
- Date of birth: 5 January 1978 (age 48)
- Place of birth: Colombes, France
- Height: 1.80 m (5 ft 11 in)
- Position: Defender

Youth career
- 1988–1995: Colombienne
- 1995–1997: Lens

Senior career*
Years	Team	Apps	(Gls)
1997–1998	Valenciennes		
1998–2003	Nice	38	(2)
2000–2001	→ Valence (loan)	32	(7)
2002	→ Livingston (loan)	0	(0)
2004	Gueugnon	17	(0)
2005–2008	Penafiel	78	(0)
2008–2010	Paços Ferreira	33	(1)
2010–2011	APOP	21	(1)
2011–2012	SMOC St Jean-de-Braye		
Total		219	(11)
- * Club domestic league appearances and goals

Kelly Mathurin Berville (born 5 January 1978) is a French retired professional footballer. A defender, he could operate as either a central defender or a left-back.

== Playing career ==
Berville signed for Scottish side Livingston on loan in 2002, but the club opted to terminate his deal after only three weeks.

In 2004, he signed for Gueugnon.
