= Philippe Celdran =

French footballer (born 1973)

Personal information
- Date of birth: 2 November 1973 (age 52)
- Place of birth: Lorient, France
- Height: 1.80 m (5 ft 11 in)
- Position: Midfielder

Senior career*
Years	Team	Apps	(Gls)
1994–1999	Guingamp	40	(1)
1997–1998	→ ASOA Valence (loan)	38	(12)
1999–2000	ASOA Valence	32	(6)
2000–2002	Sedan	41	(5)
2002–2004	Le Mans	62	(8)
2004–2005	Nancy	11	(0)
2005–2006	Amiens	33	(2)
Total		257	(34)
- * Club domestic league appearances and goals

Philippe Celdran (born 2 November 1973) is a French former professional footballer who played as a midfielder between 1994 and 2006. He played for six different clubs in France including En Avant de Guingamp, ASOA Valence, CS Sedan Ardennes, Le Mans FC, AS Nancy and Amiens SC.

For his performances in the 2002–03 Ligue 2 season he was named in the 2002–03 Ligue 2 UNFP Team of the Year.
