= US Bénédictine =

- Full name: Union Sportive Bénédictine
- Founded: 1954
- Ground: Stade Jean Allane, Saint-Benoît, Réunion
- Capacity: 1,200
- League: Réunion Premier League
- 2014: Réunion Premier League, 10th
Home colours

Union Sportive Bénédictine is a football club from Saint-Benoît, Réunion Island. The club plays their home matches at Stade Jean Allane, which has a maximum capacity of 1,200 people.

== Achievements ==
- Coupe de la Réunion: 2

1962, 1972

== The club in the French football structure ==
- Coupe de France: 5 appearances

1965–66, 1966–67, 1969–70, 1972–73, 1981–82
