= Pierre Ferrazzi =

French football player and manager (1946–2026)

Personal information
- Date of birth: 16 July 1946
- Place of birth: Dijon, France
- Date of death: 26 September 2026 (aged 80)
- Height: 1.76 m (5 ft 9 in)
- Position: Forward

Youth career
- ?–1962: Dijon

Senior career*
Years	Team	Apps	(Gls)
1962–1965	Dijon		
1965–1967	Grenoble	76	(45)
1967	Bataillon de Joinville	12	(4)
1967–1969	Nantes	22	(5)
1968–1969	Reims	22	(7)
1969–1970	Ajaccio	25	(5)
1970–1971	AS Aix-en-Provence	31	(17)
1971–1974	Stade Poitevin FC	88	(16)
1974–1975	Valence		

International career
- France amateurs
- France military

Managerial career
- 1974–1975: Valence
- * Club domestic league appearances and goals

Pierre Ferrazzi (French: [pjɛʁ fɛʁazzi]; 16 July 1946 – 26 September 2026) was a French football player and manager who played as a forward.

Ferrazzi notably scored the most goals in Division 2 in the 1965–66 season with FC Grenoble.

Ferrazzi died on 26 September 2026, at the age of 80.
