= Stade Jean Laville =

Football stadium in Gueugnon, France

Coordinates: 46°35′42.31″N 4°3′21.81″E

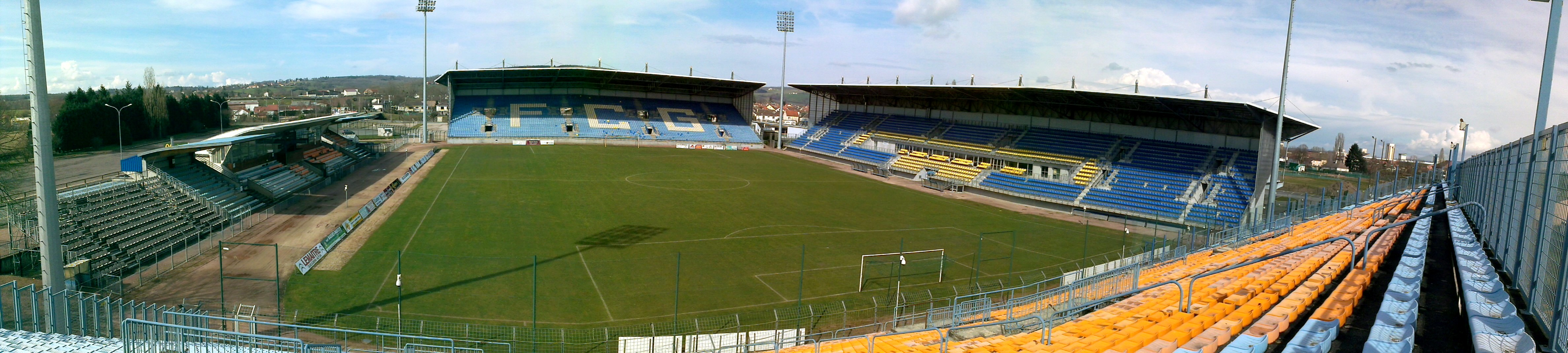
- Interactive map of Stade Jean Laville
- Location: Gueugnon, France
- Capacity: 13 800
- Surface: grass

Construction
- Opened: 1919
- Renovated: 2003

Tenant
- FC Gueugnon

Stade Jean Laville is a multi-use stadium in Gueugnon, France. It is currently used mostly for football matches and is the home stadium of FC Gueugnon. The stadium is able to hold 13,872 people.

It host two France Six Nations Under 20s Championship home matches. The first was against Scotland on February 7, 2015, with France winning 47 - 6. The other was against Italy on February 23, 2018, with France winning 78 - 12.
