= 2003–04 Coupe de la Ligue =

French League Cup

Tournament details
- Country: France
- Dates: 23 September 2003 – 17 April 2004
- Teams: 44

Final positions
- Champions: Sochaux (1st title)
- Runners-up: Nantes

Tournament statistics
- Matches played: 43
- Goals scored: 96 (2.23 per match)
- Top goal scorer: Lilian Compan (4 goals)

The 2003–04 Coupe de la Ligue was the 10th edition of the French league cup competition. The competition was organized by the Ligue de Football Professionnel and was open to the 40 professional clubs in France that are managed by the organization.

Monaco were the reigning champions, having defeated Sochaux 4–1 in the previous season's final. The previous season's finalists Sochaux returned to the final, defeating Nantes 5–4 on penalties to claim their first Coupe de la Ligue.

== First round ==
The matches were contested on 23 and 24 September 2003.

Team 1	Score	Team 2
Troyes (2)	2–0	Caen (2)
Lorient (2)	0–0 (a.e.t.) (3–0 p)	Besançon (2)
Valence (2)	1–0	Angers (2)
Nîmes (3)	4–2 (a.e.t.)	Le Havre (2)
Istres (2)	1–0	Châteauroux (2)
Sedan (2)	0–0 (a.e.t.) (5–4 p)	Reims (3)
Beauvais (3)	1–0	Grenoble (2)
Clermont (2)	3–0 (a.e.t.)	Niort (2)
Wasquehal (3)	1–2	Créteil (2)
Laval (2)	0–2	Gueugnon (2)
Amiens (2)	0–1	Nancy (2)
Saint-Étienne (2)	1–0	Rouen (2)

== Second round ==
The matches were contested on 28 and 29 October 2003.

Team 1	Score	Team 2
Marseille (1)	2–0	Monaco (1)
Metz (1)	3–0	Guingamp (1)
Lens (1)	1–1 (a.e.t.) (4–2 p)	Lyon (1)
Troyes (2)	2–1 (a.e.t.)	Créteil (2)
Strasbourg (1)	0–1	Bordeaux (1)
Sedan (2)	2–0	Lorient (2)
Auxerre (1)	1–0	Rennes (1)
Ajaccio (1)	2–2 (a.e.t.) (1–4 p)	Nice (1)
Montpellier (1)	0–1	Clermont (2)
Nantes (1)	3–1 (a.e.t.)	Nancy (2)
Saint-Étienne (2)	1–0	Beauvais (3)
Gueugnon (2)	1–1 (a.e.t.) (3–2 p)	Paris Saint-Germain (1)
Nîmes (3)	1–2	Lille (1)
Bastia (1)	1–0	Toulouse (1)
Sochaux (1)	3–2 (a.e.t.)	Valence (2)
Le Mans (1)	2–1	Istres (2)

== Round of 16 ==
The matches were contested on 16 and 17 December 2003.

16 December 2003	Lens (1)	2–0	Bordeaux (1)	Lens
21:00 CET	Rool 44'; Utaka 86'	Report		Stadium: Stade Félix-Bollaert; Attendance: 30,594; Referee: Gilles Veissière

17 December 2003	Lille (1)	2–3	Saint-Étienne (2)	Villeneuve-d'Ascq
16:05 CET	Makoun 59'; Brunel 90'	Report	Hellebuyck 24'; Marin 62'; Compan 73'	Stadium: Stadium Lille Métropole; Attendance: 7,260; Referee: Bruno Ruffray

17 December 2003	Nice (1)	1–0	Metz (1)	Nice
19:00 CET	Meslin 78'	Report		Stadium: Stade du Ray; Attendance: 7,026; Referee: Damien Ledentu

17 December 2003	Gueugnon (2)	3–1	Bastia (1)	Gueugnon
19:00 CET	Berville 17'; Gauthier 48'; Hebbar 88'	Report	Maurice 15'	Stadium: Stade Jean Laville; Attendance: 6,238; Referee: Pascal Garibian

17 December 2003	Troyes (2)	0–3	Auxerre (1)	Troyes
19:00 CET		Report	Lachuer 3'; Cissé 27'; Mexès 65'	Stadium: Stade de l'Aube; Attendance: 8,135; Referee: Claude Colombo

17 December 2003	Nantes (1)	1–0 (a.e.t.)	Clermont (2)	Nantes
19:00 CET	Yepes 119'	Report		Stadium: Stade de la Beaujoire; Attendance: 16,029; Referee: Thierry Auriac

17 December 2003	Le Mans (1)	3–1 (a.e.t.)	Sedan (2)	Le Mans
19:00 CET	Peyrelade 95', 116'; Celdran 119'	Report	Charpenet 114'	Stadium: Stade Léon-Bollée; Attendance: 5,092; Referee: Éric Poulat

17 December 2003	Sochaux (1)	1–0	Marseille (1)	Montbéliard
21:00 CET	Mathieu 43'	Report		Stadium: Stade Auguste Bonal; Attendance: 19,510; Referee: Bertrand Layec

== Quarter-finals ==
The quarter-finals were contested on 13 and 14 January 2004.

13 January 2004	Lens (1)	0–4	Sochaux (1)	Lens
21:00 CET		Report	Oruma 17'; Frau 23', 65'; Pagis 62'	Stadium: Stade Félix-Bollaert; Attendance: 20,947; Referee: Claude Colombo

14 January 2004	Le Mans (1)	1–1 (a.e.t.) (4–5 p)	Nantes (1)	Le Mans
16:05 CET	Hautcœur 65'	Report	Moldovan 63'	Stadium: Stade Léon-Bollée; Attendance: 13,072; Referee: Stéphane Bré
	Penalties
	Domoraud (penalty scored); Thomas (penalty scored); Cousin (penalty scored); Peyrelade (penalty scored); Fischer (penalty missed); Eggen (penalty missed)		(penalty scored) Ziani; (penalty scored) Pujol; (penalty scored) Yepes; (penalty missed) Guillon; (penalty scored) Pailleres; (penalty scored) N'Zigou

14 January 2004	Gueugnon (2)	0–1	Auxerre (1)	Gueugnon
19:00 CET		Report	Kalou 86'	Stadium: Stade Jean Laville; Attendance: 11,974; Referee: Bertrand Layec

14 January 2004	Saint-Étienne (2)	2–0	Nice (1)	Saint-Étienne
21:00 CET	Jau 31'; Compan 53' (pen.)	Report		Stadium: Stade Geoffroy-Guichard; Attendance: 15,194; Referee: Jean-Paul Chaudre

== Semi-finals ==
The semi-finals were contested on 3 and 4 February 2015.

3 February 2004	Nantes (1)	0–0 (a.e.t.) (5–4 p)	Auxerre (1)	Nantes
21:00 CET		Report		Stadium: Stade de la Beaujoire; Attendance: 26,971; Referee: Laurent Duhamel
	Penalties
	Yapi Yapo (penalty scored); Pujol (penalty scored); Yepes (penalty scored); Delhommeau (penalty scored); Landreau (penalty scored)		(penalty scored) Mexès; (penalty scored) Cissé; (penalty missed) Violeau; (penalty scored) Radet; (penalty scored) Akalé

4 February 2004	Saint-Étienne (2)	2–3 (a.e.t.)	Sochaux (1)	Saint-Étienne
21:00 CET	Carteron 18'; Compan 22'	Report	Mathieu 42'; Oruma 61', 104'	Stadium: Stade Geoffroy-Guichard; Attendance: 33,661; Referee: Bertrand Layec

== Final ==
The final was held on 17 April 2004 at the Stade de France, Saint-Denis.

17 April 2004
20:50

Nantes	1–1 (a.e.t.)	Sochaux
Pujol 13'	Report	Monsoreau 18'
Penalties
Quint (penalty scored); Pujol (penalty missed); Yepes (penalty scored); Yapi Yapo (penalty missed); Moldovan (penalty scored); Armand (penalty scored); Landreau (penalty missed); Delhommeau (penalty missed)	4–5	(penalty scored) Frau; (penalty missed) Isabey; (penalty scored) Mathieu; (penalty scored) Pagis; (penalty missed) Lonfat; (penalty scored) Diawara; (penalty missed) Flachez; (penalty scored) Pedretti

Stade de France, Saint-Denis
Attendance: 78,409
Referee: Pascal Garibian

== See also ==
- 2003–04 Ligue 1
- 2003–04 Ligue 2
