= 2003–04 Coupe de France =

Tournament details
- Country: France
- Teams: 6,057

Final positions
- Champions: Paris Saint-Germain
- Runners-up: Châteauroux

Tournament statistics
- Top goal scorer(s): Pauleta (5 goals)

The 2003–04 Coupe de France was the 87th edition of the annual French cup competition. It was won by Paris Saint-Germain. The cup finalist LB Châteauroux qualified for the UEFA Cup because PSG qualified to 2004–05 UEFA Champions League through league table position.

Paris Saint-Germain won the cup.

== Round of 64 ==
Team 1	Score	Team 2
Marseille (L1)	1–1 (a.e.t.) (4–3 p)	Strasbourg (L1)
Aire-sur-la-Lys (PH)	0–4	Lyon (L1)
Changé (DH)	0–3	Valenciennes (Nat.)
RC Paris (CFA)	1–3	Toulouse (L1)
Mantes (CFA)	0–3	Amiens (L2)
Poissy (CFA)	0–0 (a.e.t.) (2–4 p)	Croix de Savoie (CFA)
Saint-Colomban Locminé (DH)	0–2	Brest (Nat.)
Plabennec (CFA2)	3–0	Jeanne d'Arc de Biarritz (DHR)
Boulogne (CFA)	2–3	Créteil (L2)
Fontenay (CFA)	0–0 (a.e.t.) (4–3 p)	Bois-Guillaume (CFA2)
Moulins (CFA)	0–1	Nice (L1)
Dijon (Nat.)	0–0 (a.e.t.) (3–1 p)	Saint-Étienne (L2)
Lens (L1)	1–0	Le Mans (L1)
Gazélec Ajaccio (Nat.)	3–2	Montluçon (CFA2)
Caen (L2)	1–0	Le Havre (L2)
Laval (L2)	0–1	Reims (Nat.)
Brive (CFA)	1–1 (a.e.t.) (3–1 p)	Lorient (L2)
Bayonne (CFA)	4–4 (a.e.t.) (5–3 p)	Guingamp (L1)
Bordeaux (L1)	2–0	Libourne-Saint-Seurin (Nat.)
Mulhouse (CFA)	0–2	Montpellier (L1)
Épernay (CFA2)	0–0 (a.e.t.) (3–5 p)	Valence (L2)
Auxerre (L1)	2–0	Sochaux (L1)
Beaujolais Mont-d'Or (DH)	1–2	Nantes (L1)
Ernolsheim (DH)	0–3	Cannes (Nat.)
Bourg-Péronnas (Nat.)	4–3 (a.e.t.)	Martigues (CFA)
Besançon (L2)	2–0	Bastia (L1)
Nancy (L2)	0–0 (a.e.t.) (5–4 p)	Lille (L1)
Paris Saint-Germain (L1)	3–2 (a.e.t.)	Troyes (L2)
Grenoble (L2)	0–1	Châteauroux (L2)
Ajaccio (L1)	0–2	Gueugnon (L2)
Metz (L1)	0–2	Monaco (L1)
Angers (L2)	0–0 (a.e.t.) (4–5 p)	Rennes (L1)

== Round of 32 ==
Team 1	Score	Team 2
Bayonne (CFA)	1–0 (a.e.t.)	Bordeaux (L1)
Marseille (L1)	1–2 (a.e.t.)	Paris Saint-Germain (L1)
Auxerre (L1)	2–0	Montpellier (L1)
Bourg-Péronnas (Nat.)	0–5	Lyon (L1)
Dijon (Nat.)	2–1	Lens (L1)
Valence (L2)	2–2 (a.e.t.) (4–5 p)	Châteauroux (L2)
Besançon (L2)	1–3	Créteil (L2)
Gueugnon (L2)	1–3	Reims (Nat.)
Caen (L2)	1–0	Cannes (Nat.)
Brive (CFA)	3–2 (a.e.t.)	Nancy (L2)
Amiens (L2)	3–0	Plabennec (CFA2)
Gazélec Ajaccio (Nat.)	1–3	Brest (Nat.)
Valenciennes (Nat.)	0–0 (a.e.t.) (1–4 p)	Monaco (L1)
Croix de Savoie (CFA)	0–2	Rennes (L1)
Fontenay (CFA)	0–3	Nantes (L1)
Toulouse (L1)	0–0 (a.e.t.) (5–4 p)	Nice (L1)

== Round of 16 ==
Team 1	Score	Team 2
Brive (CFA)	1–0	Auxerre (L1)
Bayonne (CFA)	0–2	Paris Saint-Germain (L1)
Monaco (L1)	4–1	Lyon (L1)
Toulouse (L1)	1–1 (a.e.t.) (6–7 p)	Rennes (L1)
Nantes (L1)	4–0	Brest (Nat.)
Amiens (L2)	1–0	Caen (L2)
Châteauroux (L2)	2–0	Créteil (L2)
Dijon (Nat.)	1–1 (a.e.t.) (4–2 p)	Reims (Nat.)

== Quarter-finals ==
16 March 2004	Brive (4)	1–2	Paris Saint-Germain (1)	Brive-la-Gaillarde
	Forest 15'		Pauleta 27'; Reinaldo 60'	Stadium: Stade Amédée-Domenech; Attendance: 13,000; Referee: Éric Poulat

16 March 2004	Amiens (2)	0–1	Dijon (3)	Amiens
			Heitzmann 86'	Stadium: Stade de la Licorne; Attendance: 8,037; Referee: Bertrand Layec

17 March 2004	Nantes (1)	3–2	Rennes (1)	Nantes
	Vahirua 64'; Yapi-Yapo 72'; N'Zigou 88'		Barbosa 45+1'; Gillet 90+1' (o.g.)	Stadium: Stade de la Beaujoire; Attendance: 26,569; Referee: Gilles Veissière

17 March 2004	Monaco (1)	0–1	Châteauroux (2)	Monaco
			Sidibé 20'	Stadium: Stade Louis II; Attendance: 3,000; Referee: Pascal Garibian

== Semi-finals ==
28 April 2004	Nantes (1)	1–1 (a.e.t.) (3–4 p)	Paris Saint-Germain (1)	Nantes
	Yepes 90'		Fiorèse 50'	Stadium: Stade de la Beaujoire; Attendance: 36,000; Referee: Alain Sars
	Penalties
	Toulalan (penalty scored); Vahirua (penalty missed); Yepes (penalty scored); Armand (penalty scored); Da Rocha (penalty missed); Faé (penalty missed); Berson (penalty missed)		(penalty scored) Déhu; (penalty scored) Heinze; (penalty missed) Leal; (penalty missed) Cana; (penalty scored) Sorín; (penalty missed) Mendy; (penalty scored) M'bami

28 April 2004	Châteauroux (2)	2–0	Dijon (3)	Châteauroux
	Roudet 2'; Gueï 37'			Stadium: Stade Gaston Petit; Attendance: 14,850; Referee: Laurent Duhamel

== Final ==
29 May 2004
20:45

Paris Saint-Germain	1–0	Châteauroux
Pauleta 65'

Stade de France, Saint-Denis
Attendance: 78,721
Referee: Stéphane Bré

== Topscorer ==
Pauleta (5 goals)
