= 2003–04 Ligue 2 =

65th season of the second-tier football league in France

Ligue 2
- Season: 2003–04

The Ligue 2 season 2003–04, organised by the LFP was won by AS Saint-Étienne and saw the promotions of AS Saint-Étienne, SM Caen and FC Istres, whereas ASOA Valence, Besançon RC and FC Rouen were relegated to National.

== 20 participating teams ==
- Amiens
- Angers
- Besançon
- Caen
- Châteauroux
- Clermont
- Créteil
- Grenoble
- Gueugnon
- Istres
- Laval
- Le Havre
- Lorient
- Nancy
- Niort
- Rouen
- Saint-Étienne
- Sedan
- Troyes
- Valence

== League table ==
| Pos | Team | Pld | W | D | L | GF | GA | GD | Pts | Promotion or Relegation |
|---|---|---|---|---|---|---|---|---|---|---|
| 1 | Saint-Étienne (C, P) | 38 | 22 | 7 | 9 | 44 | 29 | +15 | 73 | Promotion to Ligue 1 |
| 2 | Caen (P) | 38 | 20 | 11 | 7 | 56 | 31 | +25 | 71 | Promotion to Ligue 1 |
| 3 | Istres (P) | 38 | 19 | 9 | 10 | 44 | 26 | +18 | 66 | Promotion to Ligue 1 |
| 4 | Lorient | 38 | 17 | 10 | 11 | 57 | 45 | +12 | 61 | |
| 5 | Sedan | 38 | 15 | 15 | 8 | 42 | 31 | +11 | 60 | |
| 6 | Nancy | 38 | 14 | 13 | 11 | 45 | 36 | +9 | 55 | |
| 7 | Le Havre | 38 | 15 | 10 | 13 | 44 | 46 | −2 | 55 | |
| 8 | Niort | 38 | 13 | 14 | 11 | 47 | 44 | +3 | 53 | |
| 9 | Amiens | 38 | 15 | 8 | 15 | 43 | 45 | −2 | 53 | |
| 10 | Troyes | 38 | 13 | 13 | 12 | 43 | 48 | −5 | 52 | |
| 11 | Châteauroux | 38 | 13 | 10 | 15 | 44 | 49 | −5 | 49 | Qualification for the UEFA Cup first round (Note: Since the Coupe de France winners Paris Saint-Germain qualified for the Champions League, their place in the UEFA Cup went to Châteauroux, who were the Coupe de France runners-up.) |
| 12 | Créteil | 38 | 10 | 15 | 13 | 41 | 47 | −6 | 45 | |
| 13 | Angers | 38 | 11 | 12 | 15 | 36 | 43 | −7 | 45 | |
| 14 | Clermont | 38 | 9 | 17 | 12 | 36 | 48 | −12 | 44 | |
| 15 | Grenoble | 38 | 9 | 16 | 13 | 38 | 43 | −5 | 43 | |
| 16 | Gueugnon | 38 | 9 | 15 | 14 | 40 | 43 | −3 | 42 | |
| 17 | Laval | 38 | 10 | 12 | 16 | 51 | 55 | −4 | 42 | |
| 18 | Valence (R) | 38 | 9 | 13 | 16 | 45 | 56 | −11 | 40 | Relegation to Championnat National [fr] |
| 19 | Besançon (R) | 38 | 8 | 14 | 16 | 37 | 45 | −8 | 38 | Relegation to Championnat National [fr] |
| 20 | Rouen (R) | 38 | 5 | 14 | 19 | 27 | 50 | −23 | 29 | Relegation to Championnat National [fr] |

Source: Ligue 2
(C) Champions; (P) Promoted; (R) Relegated

== Results ==
| Home \ Away | AMI | ANG | BES | CAE | CHA | CLE | CRE | GRE | GUE | IST | LAV | LHA | LOR | NAL | NRT | ROU | STE | SED | TRO | VLN |
|---|---|---|---|---|---|---|---|---|---|---|---|---|---|---|---|---|---|---|---|---|
| Amiens | | 1–0 | 1–0 | 0–3 | 0–0 | 1–2 | 1–0 | 0–1 | 1–0 | 0–0 | 3–4 | 2–0 | 1–0 | 2–1 | 2–3 | 2–1 | 1–2 | 1–1 | 1–1 | 2–2 |
| Angers | 1–2 | | 2–1 | 0–1 | 2–0 | 0–0 | 2–0 | 1–1 | 2–1 | 1–0 | 3–2 | 3–1 | 1–1 | 2–0 | 0–0 | 0–1 | 1–1 | 0–0 | 2–0 | 0–2 |
| Besançon | 0–2 | 2–0 | | 0–1 | 3–1 | 1–1 | 0–0 | 3–1 | 1–1 | 0–1 | 2–2 | 1–1 | 1–1 | 1–3 | 4–0 | 3–0 | 0–1 | 1–1 | 0–1 | 1–1 |
| Caen | 2–1 | 1–0 | 1–1 | | 1–0 | 1–2 | 1–2 | 0–0 | 2–1 | 2–1 | 1–2 | 3–1 | 2–0 | 2–0 | 2–2 | 1–1 | 1–0 | 1–0 | 3–0 | 4–1 |
| Châteauroux | 4–1 | 4–1 | 0–0 | 1–1 | | 2–2 | 1–3 | 0–0 | 3–2 | 1–0 | 2–1 | 2–1 | 2–2 | 0–0 | 0–0 | 2–0 | 2–0 | 2–0 | 1–1 | 3–0 |
| Clermont | 0–2 | 4–1 | 0–2 | 2–2 | 0–1 | | 2–0 | 2–0 | 1–0 | 1–1 | 2–1 | 1–1 | 0–4 | 0–1 | 0–1 | 0–0 | 0–3 | 0–1 | 0–0 | 1–1 |
| Créteil | 1–1 | 1–1 | 1–1 | 0–0 | 1–0 | 5–1 | | 1–1 | 1–1 | 0–2 | 3–0 | 2–3 | 1–0 | 1–0 | 2–2 | 0–0 | 1–0 | 0–1 | 1–2 | 2–1 |
| Grenoble | 1–0 | 0–0 | 0–0 | 2–1 | 4–1 | 0–0 | 1–1 | | 2–2 | 0–1 | 1–1 | 2–0 | 1–1 | 2–3 | 0–1 | 0–0 | 2–2 | 0–0 | 1–2 | 4–3 |
| Gueugnon | 0–1 | 1–1 | 1–0 | 0–0 | 2–0 | 0–0 | 1–1 | 0–2 | | 1–0 | 1–1 | 1–2 | 1–1 | 0–0 | 1–2 | 2–1 | 0–1 | 0–0 | 1–1 | 2–0 |
| Istres | 1–0 | 1–0 | 0–1 | 3–1 | 2–1 | 2–0 | 2–0 | 2–0 | 2–1 | | 2–1 | 2–0 | 1–0 | 2–0 | 2–2 | 0–0 | 0–2 | 2–0 | 0–0 | 3–1 |
| Laval | 1–2 | 3–3 | 1–3 | 1–0 | 2–0 | 2–3 | 3–1 | 2–0 | 1–2 | 0–0 | | 1–1 | 2–2 | 2–0 | 0–1 | 0–0 | 2–0 | 2–0 | 4–0 | 2–2 |
| Le Havre | 0–1 | 1–0 | 2–0 | 1–1 | 3–2 | 1–1 | 1–1 | 1–0 | 5–0 | 0–0 | 3–2 | | 1–0 | 0–0 | 1–1 | 2–0 | 1–0 | 3–0 | 3–0 | 1–0 |
| Lorient | 3–1 | 2–0 | 2–0 | 2–3 | 0–1 | 1–1 | 0–3 | 2–1 | 0–5 | 2–1 | 1–0 | 2–0 | | 2–0 | 4–2 | 4–1 | 2–0 | 1–1 | 1–0 | 3–1 |
| Nancy | 0–0 | 2–1 | 3–0 | 0–2 | 2–0 | 3–4 | 2–0 | 0–0 | 0–2 | 2–1 | 1–1 | 4–1 | 1–1 | | 1–0 | 2–1 | 0–1 | 2–0 | 3–0 | 1–1 |
| Niort | 0–0 | 0–1 | 3–0 | 0–3 | 0–0 | 3–1 | 3–0 | 1–1 | 1–3 | 2–1 | 4–0 | 0–0 | 1–2 | 2–2 | | 2–1 | 0–1 | 1–1 | 2–1 | 1–0 |
| Rouen | 2–1 | 3–1 | 1–1 | 1–2 | 1–4 | 0–0 | 1–1 | 0–2 | 0–0 | 1–3 | 1–1 | 4–0 | 0–1 | 1–1 | 2–1 | | 0–1 | 0–1 | 0–1 | 1–1 |
| Saint-Étienne | 0–2 | 0–0 | 2–1 | 1–0 | 2–1 | 0–0 | 3–2 | 1–0 | 1–1 | 0–0 | 2–0 | 2–0 | 2–1 | 0–0 | 2–1 | 2–0 | | 0–2 | 2–3 | 1–0 |
| Sedan | 3–1 | 1–0 | 2–0 | 0–0 | 2–0 | 1–1 | 4–0 | 4–1 | 1–1 | 3–1 | 1–0 | 2–0 | 2–1 | 0–4 | 1–1 | 0–0 | 1–2 | | 3–0 | 0–0 |
| Troyes | 3–2 | 2–2 | 1–1 | 2–2 | 4–0 | 2–0 | 0–0 | 3–2 | 2–1 | 0–2 | 0–0 | 2–0 | 3–3 | 1–1 | 1–0 | 3–0 | 0–1 | 0–0 | | 0–1 |
| Valence | 2–1 | 0–1 | 3–1 | 0–2 | 3–0 | 1–1 | 2–2 | 1–2 | 3–1 | 0–0 | 2–1 | 1–2 | 1–2 | 0–0 | 1–1 | 2–1 | 1–3 | 2–2 | 2–1 | |

Source: Ligue 2
Legend: Blue = home team win; Yellow = draw; Red = away team win.

== Top goalscorers ==
| Rank | Player | Club | Goals |
|---|---|---|---|
| 1 | (France) David Suarez | Amiens | 17 |
| 2 | (France) Laurent Dufresne | Nancy | 16 |
| 3 | (France) Bertrand Fayolle | Valence | 15 |
| 3 | (France) Guilherme Mauricio | Laval | 15 |
| 5 | (France) Hervé Bugnet | Le Havre | 13 |
| 6 | (France) Cyrille Watier | Caen | 12 |
| 6 | (Algeria) Mansour Boutabout | Gueugnon | 12 |
| 6 | (Ivory Coast) Marc-Éric Gueï | Châteauroux | 12 |
| 6 | (Togo) Robert Malm | Grenoble | 12 |
| 6 | (France) Jacques Rémy | Istres | 12 |

== Attendances ==
| # | Club | Average |
|---|---|---|
| 1 | Saint-Étienne | 21,950 |
| 2 | Caen | 12,635 |
| 3 | Sedan | 9,426 |
| 4 | Le Havre | 8,228 |
| 5 | Lorient | 7,952 |
| 6 | Amiens | 7,859 |
| 7 | La Berrichonne | 6,750 |
| 8 | Nancy | 6,362 |
| 9 | Clermont | 6,111 |
| 10 | ESTAC | 6,089 |
| 11 | Rouen | 5,911 |
| 12 | Angers | 5,408 |
| 13 | Grenoble | 5,197 |
| 14 | Chamois niortais | 4,586 |
| 15 | Gueugnon | 3,891 |
| 16 | Stade lavallois | 3,846 |
| 17 | Besançon | 3,733 |
| 18 | Valence | 2,910 |
| 19 | Istres | 2,102 |
| 20 | Créteil | 1,965 |
