= ASOA Valence =

French football team

- Logo
- Full name: Association Sportive d'Origine Arménienne de Valence
- Founded: 1920; 106 years ago
- Dissolved: 2005; 21 years ago
- Ground: Stade Georges Pompidou; Valence; France
- Capacity: 12,500
- League: CFA 2
Home colours	Away colours

Association Sportive d'Origine Arménienne de Valence was a French football team playing in the city of Valence, Drôme.

== History ==
The team dissolved in 2005 due to financial problems. Its successor is AS Valence, which plays at an amateur level.

== Managerial history ==
- 1984 – 11/1993: (France) Pierre Ferrazzi
- 11/1993 – 1995: (France) Didier Notheaux
- 1995 – 1998: (France) Léonce Lavagne
- 1998 – 11/1999: (France) Bruno Metsu
- 11/1999 – 09/2000: (France) Denis Zanko
- 09/2000 – 2003: (France) Didier Notheaux
- 2003 – 2005: (France) Alain Ravera
- 2005 – August 2005: (France) Jean-Christophe Cano
