= 2003 Coupe de la Ligue final =

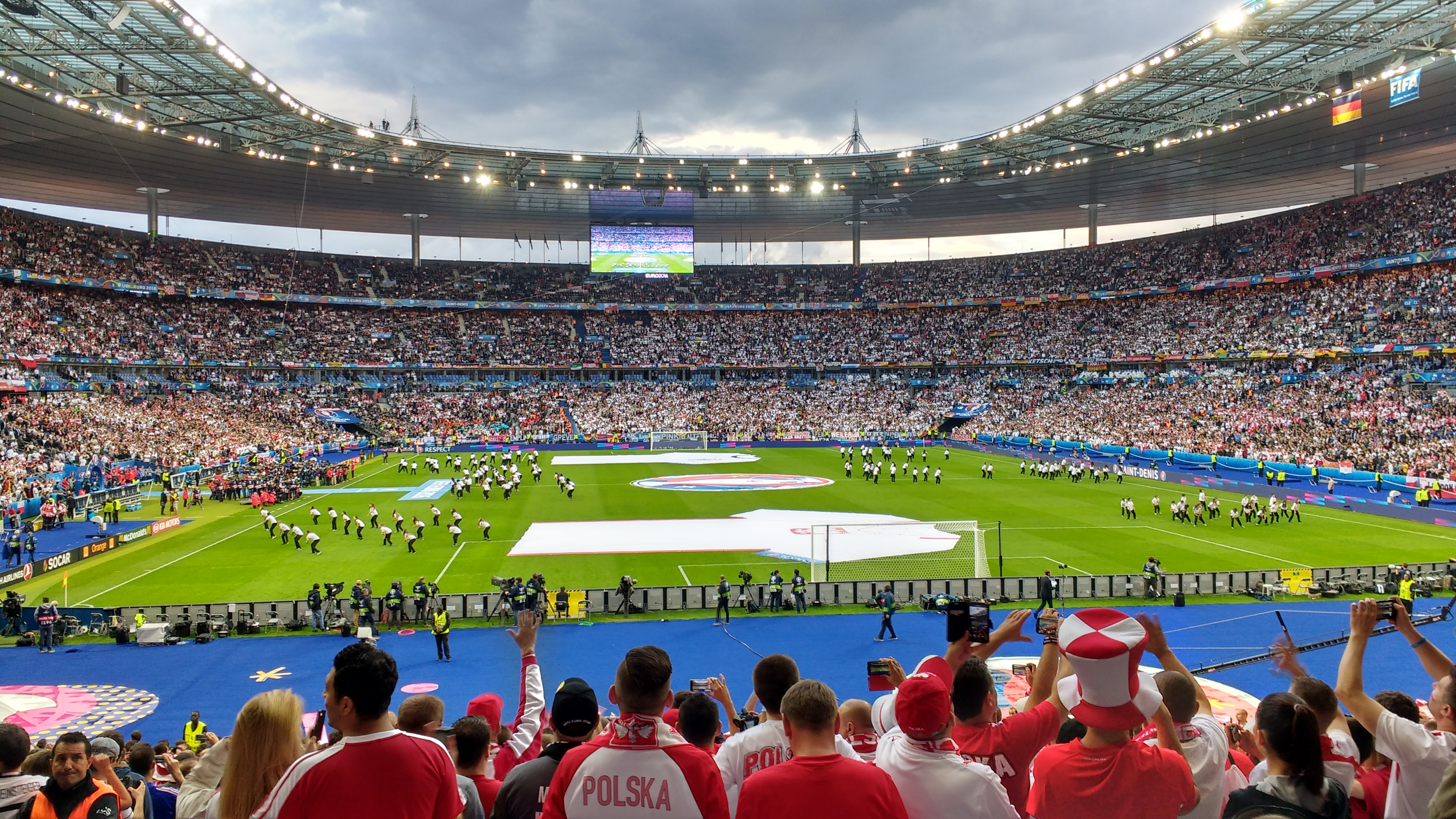
- Event: 2002–03 Coupe de la Ligue
Monaco	Sochaux
Ligue 1	Ligue 1
4	1
- Date: 17 May 2003
- Venue: Stade de France, Saint-Denis
- Referee: Damien Ledentu
- Attendance: 78,409

The 2003 Coupe de la Ligue final was a football match played at Stade de France, Saint-Denis on 17 May 2003 that saw Monaco defeat Sochaux 4–1 thanks to goals by Ludovic Giuly (2), Sébastien Squillaci and Dado Prso.

== Route to the final ==
Note: In all results below, the score of the finalist is given first (H: home; A: away).

Monaco		Round	Sochaux	
Opponent	Result	2002–03 Coupe de la Ligue	Opponent	Result
Auxerre (H)	1–0	Second round	Ajaccio (H)	3–0
Beauvais (A)	1–0	Round of 16	Lyon (H)	3–3 (a.e.t.) (5–3 p)
Gueugnon (A)	5–0	Quarter-finals	Lille (A)	4–0 (a.e.t.)
Marseille (A)	1–0	Semi-finals	Metz (A)	3–2 (a.e.t.)

== Match details ==
17 May 2003
20:45

Monaco	4–1	Sochaux
Giuly 56', 77'; Squillaci 60'; Pršo 66'		Saveljić 87' (pen.)

Stade de France, Saint-Denis
Attendance: 75,379
Referee: Damien Ledentu

GK	30	(Italy) Flavio Roma
DF	3	(France) Patrice Evra
DF	19	(France) Sébastien Squillaci
DF	27	(France) Julien Rodriguez	(substituted off) 81'
DF	4	(Mexico) Rafael Márquez
DF	35	(Norway) Hassan El Fakiri
MF	8	(France) Ludovic Giuly (c)
MF	7	(Argentina) Lucas Bernardi
MF	25	(France) Jérôme Rothen
FW	9	(Croatia) Dado Prso	(substituted off) 74'
FW	18	(Democratic Republic of the Congo) Shabani Nonda	(substituted off) 77'
Substitutes:
GK	29	(Senegal) Tony Sylva
DF	5	(France) Eric Cubilier
DF	32	(France) Gaël Givet	(substituted on) 81'
MF	10	(Argentina) Marcelo Gallardo	(substituted on) 74'
FW	26	(Senegal) Souleymane Camara	(substituted on) 77'
Manager:
(France) Didier Deschamps

GK	16	(France) Teddy Richert
DF	19	(France) Philippe Raschke	(substituted off) 79'
DF	5	(Serbia and Montenegro) Niša Saveljić
DF	4	(France) Maxence Flachez
DF	24	(France) Sylvain Monsoreau
MF	25	(France) Jérémy Mathieu
MF	10	(Nigeria) Wilson Oruma	(substituted off) 74'
MF	17	(France) Benoît Pedretti (c)
FW	9	(France) Mickaël Pagis
FW	13	(France) Pierre-Alain Frau
FW	14	(Tunisia) Santos	(substituted off) 46'
Substitutes:
GK	1	(Ivory Coast) Gérard Gnanhouan
DF	2	(Senegal) Ibrahim Tall	(substituted on) 79'
MF	6	(Switzerland) Johann Lonfat	(substituted on) 74'
MF	8	(France) Fabien Boudarène
MF	12	(France) Michaël Isabey	(substituted on) 46'
Manager:
(France) Guy Lacombe

== See also ==
- 2003 Coupe de France final
- 2002–03 AS Monaco FC season
- 2002–03 FC Sochaux-Montbéliard season
