= 2004–05 FC Sochaux-Montbéliard season =

Sochaux
2004–05 season
- President: Jean-Claude Plessis
- Manager: Guy Lacombe
- Stadium: Stade Auguste Bonal
- Ligue 1: 10th
- Coupe de France: Quarter-finals
- Coupe de la Ligue: Third round
- UEFA Cup: Round of 32
- Top goalscorer: League: Ilan (12); All: Ilan (17)
- Average home league attendance: 15,689

The 2004–05 FC Sochaux-Montbéliard season was the club's 77th season in existence and the club's fourth consecutive season in the first division of French football. In addition to the domestic league, Sochaux participated in this season's edition of the Coupe de France, the Coupe de la Ligue and the UEFA Cup. The season covers the period from 1 July 2004 to 30 June 2005.

== Season summary ==
Sochaux dropped five places in the table to finish 10th, their lowest finish since promotion in 2001. Manager Guy Lacombe left at the end of the season to manage Paris Saint-Germain. He was replaced by former Ajaccio manager Dominique Bijotat.

== First-team squad ==
Squad at end of season

Note: Flags indicate national team as defined under FIFA eligibility rules; some limited exceptions apply. Players may hold more than one non-FIFA nationality.

No.	Pos.	Nation	Player
1	GK	CIV	Gérard Gnanhouan (Note: Gnanhouan was born in Adzope, Ivory Coast, but also qualified to represent France internationally and represented them at U-18 level before making his international debut for Ivory Coast in 2003.)
2	DF	SEN	Ibrahim Tall (Note: Tall was born in Aubervilliers, France, but also qualified to represent Senegal internationally through his parents and made his international debut for Senegal in 2003.)
3	DF	FRA	Grégory Paisley
5	DF	FRA	Sylvain Monsoreau
6	DF	FRA	Lionel Potillon
7	FW	TOG	Mohamed Kader
8	MF	FRA	Fabien Boudarène
9	FW	BRA	Ilan
10	MF	NGA	Wilson Oruma
11	FW	TUN	Francileudo Santos (Note: Santos was born in Zé Doca, Brazil, but also qualified to represent Tunisia internationally and made his international debut for Tunisia in 2004.)
12	MF	FRA	Michaël Isabey
14	MF	SUI	Johann Lonfat
16	GK	FRA	Teddy Richert
17	MF	FRA	Romain Pitau
18	MF	SEN	Guirane N'Daw
20	MF	MLI	Sigamary Diarra (Note: Diarra was born in Villepinte, France, but also qualified to represent Mali internationally and made his international debut for Mali in 2004.)
21	DF	SEN	Souleymane Diawara
22	FW	FRA	Thomas Régnier
23	DF	FRA	Cédric Rey
24	DF	FRA	Aimé Lavie
25	DF	FRA	Jérémy Mathieu

No.	Pos.	Nation	Player
26	MF	FRA	Jérémy Ménez
27	DF	SEN	Omar Daf
28	MF	ARG	Marcello Trapasso
29	MF	MAR	Jaouad Zairi
30	GK	FRA	Alexandre Martinović
31	DF	EGY	Ahmed Samir Farag
32	DF	KOR	Cho Won-kwang
34	FW	FRA	Francis Laurent
40	MF	FRA	Steve Bernardet
41	DF	FRA	Jean Calvé
42	GK	FRA	Jérémy Deichelbohrer
43	MF	FRA	Hakim El Bounadi
44	FW	FRA	Mevlüt Erdinç (Note: Erdinç was born in Saint-Claude, France, and represented them at U-17, U-19, and U-21 level, but also qualified to represent Turkey internationally through his parents and would make his international debut for Turkey in March 2008.)
45	MF	FRA	Benjamin Genghini
46	DF	FRA	Maxime Josse
47	MF	FRA	Fabien Lavoyer
48	MF	FRA	Kevin Le Bigot
49	DF	FRA	Mathieu Pelletey
50	FW	FRA	Gabriel Rodriguez
51	MF	SEN	Badara Sène
52	MF	ALG	Toufik Zerara

=== Left club during season ===
Note: Flags indicate national team as defined under FIFA eligibility rules; some limited exceptions apply. Players may hold more than one non-FIFA nationality.

No.	Pos.	Nation	Player
4	DF	FRA	Maxence Flachez (to Guingamp)
7	MF	TUN	Adel Chedli (Note: Chedli was born in La Ricamarie, France, but also qualified to represent Tunisia internationally and made his international debut for Tunisia in May 1996.) (to Istres)

No.	Pos.	Nation	Player
19	FW	SEN	Basile de Carvalho (Note: De Carvalho was born in Ziguinchor, Senegal, but also qualified to represent Guinea-Bissau internationally and would make his international debut for Guinea-Bissau in March 2011.) (to Stade Brest)

== Competitions ==
=== Overview ===
Competition	First match	Last match	Starting round	Final position	Record							
Competition	First match	Last match	Starting round	Final position	Pld	W	D	L	GF	GA	GD	Win %
Ligue 1	7 August 2004	28 May 2005	Matchday 1	10th	38	13	11	14	42	41	+1	34.21
Coupe de France	8 January 2005	1 March 2005	Round of 64	Quarter-finals	4	3	0	1	8	4	+4	75.00
Coupe de la Ligue	9 November 2004	22 December 2004	Second round	Third round	2	1	1	0	2	1	+1	50.00
UEFA Cup	16 September 2004	24 February 2005	First round	Round of 32	8	5	0	3	13	6	+7	62.50
Total					52	22	12	18	65	52	+13	42.31

Source: Competitions

=== Ligue 1 ===
==== League table ====
Pos	Team	Pld	W	D	L	GF	GA	GD	Pts	Qualification or relegation
8	Auxerre	38	14	10	14	48	47	+1	52	Qualification to UEFA Cup first round (Note: Auxerre was qualified for the 2005–06 UEFA Cup as winners of the 2004–05 Coupe de France.)
9	Paris Saint-Germain	38	12	15	11	40	41	−1	51	
10	Sochaux	38	13	11	14	42	41	+1	50	
11	Strasbourg	38	12	12	14	42	43	−1	48	Qualification to UEFA Cup first round (Note: Strasbourg was qualified for the 2005–06 UEFA Cup as winners of the 2004–05 Coupe de la Ligue.)
12	Nice	38	10	16	12	38	45	−7	46	

Source: Ligue 1
Rules for classification: 1) points; 2) goal difference; 3) number of goals scored.

==== Results summary ====
Overall								Home						Away					
Pld	W	D	L	GF	GA	GD	Pts	W	D	L	GF	GA	GD	W	D	L	GF	GA	GD
38	13	11	14	42	41	+1	50	10	3	6	25	16	+9	3	8	8	17	25	−8

==== Results by round ====
Round	1	2	3	4	5	6	7	8	9	10	11	12	13	14	15	16	17	18	19	20	21	22	23	24	25	26	27	28	29	30	31	32	33	34	35	36	37	38
Ground	H	A	H	A	H	A	H	H	A	H	A	H	A	H	A	H	A	H	A	H	A	H	A	H	A	A	H	A	H	A	H	A	H	A	H	A	H	A
Result	W	D	L	L	W	L	L	W	D	W	D	W	W	D	W	L	D	L	D	L	L	W	W	D	D	L	W	L	W	D	W	L	D	L	L	D	W	L
Position	4	7	12	12	11	13	14	13	14	9	8	6	4	4	3	3	4	7	8	9	10	7	7	7	6	8	6	9	7	7	7	8	7	9	10	10	8	10

A = Away; H = Home; W = Win; D = Draw; L = Loss

==== Matches ====
7 August 2004 1	Sochaux	1–0	Ajaccio	Montbéliard
19:00 CET (UTC+1)	Monsoreau 30'	Report		Stadium: Stade Auguste-Bonal; Attendance: 13,662; Referee: Pascal Viléo

14 August 2004 2	Lyon	1–1	Sochaux	Lyon
19:00 CET (UTC+1)	Juninho 71' (pen.)	Report	Potillon 39'	Stadium: Stade de Gerland; Attendance: 38,041; Referee: Stéphane Bré

12 September 2004 5	Sochaux	2–0	Marseille	Montbéliard
21:00	Mathieu 37'; Santos 63'			Stadium: Stade Auguste Bonal; Attendance: 19,931; Referee: Gilles Veissière

22 September 2004 7	Sochaux	0–2	Lille	Montbéliard
20:30 CET (UTC+1)		Report	Potillon 53' (o.g.); Brunel 90' (pen.)	Stadium: Stade Auguste Bonal; Attendance: 11,905; Referee: Philippe Malige

16 October 2004 10	Sochaux	3–0	Rennes	Montbéliard
19:00 CET (UTC+1)	Ilan 24', 59', 76'	Report		Stadium: Stade Auguste-Bonal; Attendance: 13,579; Referee: Thierry Auriac

19 November 2004 15	Monaco	1–3	Sochaux	Fontvieille
17:00 CET (UTC+1)	Kallon (yellow card) 34'; Modesto (yellow card) 39'; Zikos (yellow card) 67'; Adebayor 68'	Report	Ménez 31'; Tall (yellow card) 47'; Oruma (yellow card) 57' (goal) 63'; Ilan (yellow card) 75' (goal) 79'	Stadium: Stade Louis II; Attendance: 12,897; Referee: Pascal Viléo

12 January 2005 20	Sochaux	0–2	Lyon	Montbéliard
20:30 CET (UTC+1)		Report	Bergougnoux 6'; Diarra 42'	Stadium: Stade Auguste Bonal; Attendance: 17,249; Referee: (Luxembourg) Alain Hamer

5 February 2005 25	Lille	0–0	Sochaux	Villeneuve d'Ascq
17:15 CET (UTC+1)		Report		Stadium: Stadium Lille Métropole; Attendance: 11,088; Referee: Alain Sars

5 March 2005 28	Rennes	3–0	Sochaux	Rennes
19:00 CET (UTC+1)	Frei 5', 89'; Källström 13'	Report		Stadium: Stade de la route de Lorient; Attendance: 23,472; Referee: Gilles Veissière

16 April 2005 33	Sochaux	1–1	Monaco	Montbéliard
20:00 CEST (UTC+2)	Pitau (yellow card) 6'; Ilan 37'; Paisley (yellow card) 69'; Isabey (yellow card) 82'	Report	Chevantón 10' (yellow card) 34'; Evra (yellow card) 64'; Zikos (yellow card) 80'; Adebayor (red card) 87'	Stadium: Stade Auguste-Bonal; Attendance: 19,696; Referee: Alain Sars

28 May 2005 38	Ajaccio	3–1	Sochaux	Ajaccio
20:00 CET (UTC+1)	Lucas Pereira 14'; Ouadah 53'; Merlin 87'	Report	Kader 6'	Stadium: Stade François Coty; Attendance: 4,707; Referee: Bertrand Layec

=== UEFA Cup ===
==== First round ====
16 September 2004 First leg	Sochaux (France)	4–0	(Norway) Stabæk	Montbéliard, France
20:30	Oruma 25'; Zairi 60'; Ilan 69'; Isabey 85'	Report		Stadium: Stade Auguste Bonal; Referee: Alon Yefet (Israel)

30 September 2004 Second leg	Stabæk (Norway)	0–5 (0–9 agg.)	(France) Sochaux	Oslo, Norway
19:00		Report	Santos 26'; Zairi 35'; Ilan 76', 90'; Mathieu 81'	Stadium: Ullevaal Stadion; Referee: Ruud Bossen (Netherlands)

==== Group stage ====
Pos	Team	Pld	W	D	L	GF	GA	GD	Pts	Qualification
1	(England) Newcastle United	4	3	1	0	8	1	+7	10	Advance to knockout stage
2	(France) Sochaux	4	3	0	1	4	4	0	9	Advance to knockout stage
3	(Portugal) Sporting CP	4	2	1	1	9	3	+6	7	Advance to knockout stage
4	(Greece) Panionios	4	1	0	3	6	8	−2	3	
5	(Georgia (country)) Dinamo Tbilisi	4	0	0	4	2	13	−11	0	

Source: RSSSF

21 October 2004 1	Dinamo Tbilisi (Georgia (country))	0–2	(France) Sochaux	Tbilisi, Georgia
20:00		Report	Ilan 17'; Paisley 37'	Stadium: Mikheil Meskhi Stadium; Attendance: 18,000; Referee: Stefan Messner (Austria)

25 November 2004 2	Sochaux (France)	0–4	(England) Newcastle United	Montbéliard, France
20:45		Report	Bowyer 62'; Ameobi 46'; Bellamy 76'; Robert 90'	Stadium: Stade Auguste Bonal; Attendance: 15,175; Referee: Carlos Megía Dávila (Spain)

1 December 2004 3	Sporting CP (Portugal)	0–1	(France) Sochaux	Lisbon, Portugal
20:45		Report	Lonfat 2'	Stadium: Estádio José Alvalade; Attendance: 21,349; Referee: Helmut Fleischer (Germany)

16 December 2004 4	Sochaux (France)	1–0	(Greece) Panionios	Montbéliard, France
20:45	Isabey 86'	Report		Stadium: Stade Auguste Bonal; Attendance: 10,500; Referee: Dick van Egmond (Netherlands)

==== Round of 32 ====
17 February 2005 First leg	Olympiacos (Greece)	1–0	(France) Sochaux	Piraeus, Greece
20:45	Okkas 29'	Report		Stadium: Karaiskakis Stadium; Attendance: 33,000; Referee: Nikolai Ivanov (Russia)

24 February 2005 Second leg	Sochaux (France)	0–1 (0–2 agg.)	(Greece) Olympiacos	Montbéliard, France
19:00		Report	Stoltidis 67'	Stadium: Stade Auguste Bonal; Attendance: 17,000; Referee: Markus Nobs (Switzerland)
