= 2003–04 FC Sochaux-Montbéliard season =

Sochaux
2003–04 season
- President: Jean-Claude Plessis
- Manager: Guy Lacombe
- Stadium: Stade Auguste Bonal
- Ligue 1: 5th
- Coupe de France: Round of 64
- Coupe de la Ligue: Winners
- UEFA Cup: Third round
- Top goalscorer: League: Pierre-Alain Frau (17); All: Pierre-Alain Frau (23)
- Average home league attendance: 16,603

The 2003–04 season was the 75th season in the existence of FC Sochaux-Montbéliard and the club's third consecutive season in the top flight of French football. In addition to the domestic league, Sochaux participated in this season's editions of the Coupe de France, Coupe de la Ligue, and UEFA Cup. The season covered the period from 1 July 2003 to 30 June 2004.

== First-team squad ==
Squad at end of season

Note: Flags indicate national team as defined under FIFA eligibility rules; some limited exceptions apply. Players may hold more than one non-FIFA nationality.

No.	Pos.	Nation	Player
1	GK	CIV	Gérard Gnanhouan
2	DF	SEN	Ibrahim Tall
3	DF	FRA	Grégory Paisley
4	DF	FRA	Maxence Flachez
5	DF	FRA	Sylvain Monsoreau
7	MF	TUN	Adel Chedli
8	MF	FRA	Fabien Boudarène
9	FW	FRA	Mickaël Pagis
10	MF	NGA	Wilson Oruma
11	FW	BRA	Francileudo Santos
12	MF	FRA	Michaël Isabey
13	FW	FRA	Pierre-Alain Frau
14	MF	SUI	Johann Lonfat

No.	Pos.	Nation	Player
16	GK	FRA	Teddy Richert
17	MF	FRA	Benoît Pedretti
18	MF	SEN	Guirane N'Daw
19	DF	FRA	Philippe Raschke
20	FW	FRA	Sigamary Diarra
21	DF	SEN	Souleymane Diawara
25	MF	FRA	Jérémy Mathieu
27	DF	SEN	Omar Daf
28	MF	ARG	Marcelo Trapasso
29	FW	MAR	Jaouad Zaïri
30	GK	FRA	Alexandre Martinović
32	MF	FRA	Jeremi Leguen

== Competitions ==
=== Overview ===
Competition	First match	Last match	Starting round	Final position	Record							
Competition	First match	Last match	Starting round	Final position	Pld	W	D	L	GF	GA	GD	Win %
Ligue 1	2 August 2003	23 May 2004	Matchday 1	5th	38	18	9	11	54	42	+12	47.37
Coupe de France	3 January 2004		Round of 64	Round of 64	1	0	0	1	0	2	−2	0.00
Coupe de la Ligue	29 October 2003	17 April 2004	First round	Winners	5	4	1	0	12	5	+7	80.00
UEFA Cup	24 September 2003	3 March 2004	First round	Third round	6	3	3	0	11	4	+7	50.00
Total					50	25	13	12	77	53	+24	50.00

Source: Competitions

=== Ligue 1 ===
==== League table ====
Pos	Team	Pld	W	D	L	GF	GA	GD	Pts	Qualification or relegation
3	Monaco	38	21	12	5	59	30	+29	75	Qualification to Champions League third qualifying round
4	Auxerre	38	19	8	11	60	34	+26	65	Qualification to UEFA Cup first round
5	Sochaux	38	18	9	11	54	42	+12	63	Qualification to UEFA Cup first round
6	Nantes	38	17	9	12	47	35	+12	60	Qualification to Intertoto Cup third round
7	Marseille	38	17	6	15	51	45	+6	57	

Source: Ligue 1
Rules for classification: 1) points; 2) goal difference; 3) number of goals scored.

==== Results summary ====
Overall								Home						Away					
Pld	W	D	L	GF	GA	GD	Pts	W	D	L	GF	GA	GD	W	D	L	GF	GA	GD
38	18	9	11	54	42	+12	63	12	4	3	33	17	+16	6	5	8	21	25	−4

==== Results by round ====
Round	1	2	3	4	5	6	7	8	9	10	11	12	13	14	15	16	17	18	19	20	21	22	23	24	25	26	27	28	29	30	31	32	33	34	35	36	37	38
Ground	H	A	H	A	H	A	H	A	H	A	H	A	H	A	H	A	A	H	A	H	A	H	A	H	A	H	A	H	A	H	A	H	A	H	H	A	H	A
Result	W	L	D	L	W	W	W	L	L	D	D	W	W	W	W	W	W	W	D	D	L	W	L	D	W	W	D	L	D	W	D	W	L	W	L	L	W	L
Position	2	12	10	13	10	7	4	7	9	10	10	9	6	5	5	3	3	3	3	3	5	4	5	5	5	4	4	4	4	4	4	4	5	4	4	5	4	5

A = Away; H = Home; W = Win; D = Draw; L = Loss

==== Matches ====
2 August 2003 1	Sochaux	2–1	Nantes	Montbéliard
20:00				Stadium: Stade Auguste Bonal; Attendance: 16,243

9 August 2003 2	Nice	1–0	Sochaux	Nice
20:00				Stadium: Stade du Ray; Attendance: 13,946

16 August 2003 3	Sochaux	1–1	Rennes	Montbéliard
20:00				Stadium: Stade Auguste Bonal; Attendance: 14,069

23 August 2003 4	Marseille	2–0	Sochaux	Marseille
20:00				Stadium: Stade Vélodrome; Attendance: 55,782

30 August 2003 5	Sochaux	2–1	Lille	Montbéliard
20:00				Stadium: Stade Auguste Bonal; Attendance: 14,643

13 September 2003 6	Bordeaux	1–3	Sochaux	Bordeaux
20:00				Stadium: Stade Chaban-Delmas; Attendance: 22,208

20 September 2003 7	Sochaux	3–0	Strasbourg	Montbéliard
20:00				Stadium: Stade Auguste Bonal; Attendance: 16,729

27 September 2003 8	Bastia	2–0	Sochaux	Furiani
20:00				Stadium: Stade Armand Cesari; Attendance: 5,844

4 October 2003 9	Sochaux	0–1	Paris Saint-Germain	Montbéliard
20:00				Stadium: Stade Auguste Bonal; Attendance: 19,561

18 October 2003 10	Lyon	1–1	Sochaux	Lyon
20:00				Stadium: Stade de Gerland; Attendance: 36,907

26 October 2003 11	Sochaux	1–1	Monaco	Montbéliard
20:45				Stadium: Stade Auguste Bonal; Attendance: 19,232

1 November 2003 12	Metz	0–1	Sochaux	Metz
20:00				Stadium: Stade Saint-Symphorien; Attendance: 16,834

9 November 2003 13	Sochaux	3–1	Toulouse	Montbéliard
18:00				Stadium: Stade Auguste Bonal; Attendance: 15,425

22 November 2003 14	Guingamp	1–2	Sochaux	Guingamp
20:00				Stadium: Stade de Roudourou; Attendance: 14,458

30 November 2003 15	Sochaux	3–2	Auxerre	Montbéliard
18:00				Stadium: Stade Auguste Bonal; Attendance: 17,796

6 December 2003 17	Lens	0–3	Sochaux	Lens
17:15				Stadium: Stade Félix Bollaert; Attendance: 34,340

13 December 2003 18	Sochaux	2–0	Ajaccio	Montbéliard
20:00				Stadium: Stade Auguste Bonal; Attendance: 13,699

20 December 2003 19	Le Mans	2–2	Sochaux	Le Mans
20:00				Stadium: Stade Léon-Bollée; Attendance: 12,579

10 January 2004 20	Sochaux	0–0	Nice	Montbéliard
20:00				Stadium: Stade Auguste Bonal; Attendance: 12,728

17 January 2004 21	Rennes	4–0	Sochaux	Rennes
20:00				Stadium: Stade de la Route de Lorient; Attendance: 15,225

21 January 2004 16	Montpellier	1–3	Sochaux	Montpellier
20:00				Stadium: Stade de la Mosson; Attendance: 10,755

31 January 2004 22	Sochaux	2–1	Marseille	Montbéliard
20:00				Stadium: Stade Auguste Bonal; Attendance: 19,754

7 February 2004 23	Lille	2–0	Sochaux	Lille
20:00				Stadium: Stade Grimonprez-Jooris; Attendance: 14,426

14 February 2004 24	Sochaux	1–1	Bordeaux	Montbéliard
17:15				Stadium: Stade Auguste Bonal; Attendance: 15,276

21 February 2004 25	Strasbourg	0–2	Sochaux	Strasbourg
20:00				Stadium: Stade de la Meinau; Attendance: 18,019

29 February 2004 26	Sochaux	2–1	Bastia	Montbéliard
18:00				Stadium: Stade Auguste Bonal; Attendance: 15,930

6 March 2004 27	Paris Saint-Germain	1–1	Sochaux	Paris
20:00				Stadium: Parc des Princes; Attendance: 41,544

13 March 2004 28	Sochaux	1–2	Lyon	Montbéliard
20:00				Stadium: Stade Auguste Bonal; Attendance: 19,495

20 March 2004 29	Monaco	1–1	Sochaux	Monaco
20:00				Stadium: Stade Louis II; Attendance: 10,448

27 March 2004 30	Sochaux	2–0	Metz	Montbéliard
17:15				Stadium: Stade Auguste Bonal; Attendance: 14,373

3 April 2004 31	Toulouse	0–0	Sochaux	Toulouse
20:00				Stadium: Stadium de Toulouse; Attendance: 21,109

10 April 2004 32	Sochaux	2–0	Guingamp	Montbéliard
20:00				Stadium: Stade Auguste Bonal; Attendance: 15,144; Referee: Olivier Thual

24 April 2004 33	Auxerre	2–1	Sochaux	Auxerre
20:00				Stadium: Stade de l'Abbé Deschamps; Attendance: 18,491

1 May 2004 34	Sochaux	3–1	Montpellier	Montbéliard
20:00				Stadium: Stade Auguste Bonal; Attendance: 16,352; Referee: Hervé Piccirillo

8 May 2004 35	Sochaux	0–3	Lens	Montbéliard
20:00				Stadium: Stade Auguste Bonal; Attendance: 19,791; Referee: Pascal Viléo

12 May 2004 36	Ajaccio	1–0	Sochaux	Ajaccio
20:30				Stadium: Stade François Coty; Attendance: 2,975

15 May 2004 37	Sochaux	3–0	Le Mans	Montbéliard
20:00				Stadium: Stade Auguste Bonal; Attendance: 17,387; Referee: Gilles Veissière

23 May 2004 38	Nantes	3–1	Sochaux	Nantes
20:00				Stadium: Stade de La Beaujoire; Attendance: 28,506

=== Coupe de France ===
3 January 2004 Round of 64	Auxerre	2–0	Sochaux	Auxerre
20:30				Stadium: Stade de l'Abbé Deschamps; Attendance: 5,803; Referee: Stéphane Bré

=== Coupe de la Ligue ===
29 October 2003 First round	Sochaux	3–2 (a.e.t.)	ASOA Valence	Montbéliard
19:00				Stadium: Stade Auguste Bonal; Attendance: 9,131; Referee: Bruno Ruffray

17 December 2003 Round of 16	Sochaux	1–0	Marseille	Montbéliard
21:00				Stadium: Stade Auguste Bonal; Attendance: 19,510; Referee: Bertrand Layec

13 January 2004 Quarter-finals	Lens	0–4	Sochaux	Lens
21:00				Stadium: Stade Félix-Bollaert; Attendance: 20,947; Referee: Bertrand Layec

3 February 2004 Semi-finals	Saint-Étienne	2–3 (a.e.t.)	Sochaux	Saint-Étienne
21:00	Carteron 18'; Compan 22'		Mathieu 42'; Oruma 61', 103'	Stadium: Stade de l'Abbé Deschamps; Attendance: 33,665; Referee: Bertrand Layec

17 April 2004 Final	Nantes	1–1 (a.e.t.) (4–5 p)	Sochaux	Saint-Denis
20:50	Pujol 14'		Monsoreau 19'	Stadium: Stade de France; Attendance: 78,409; Referee: Pascal Garibian

=== UEFA Cup ===
==== First round ====
24 September 2003 First leg	MyPa (Finland)	0–1	(France) Sochaux	Kouvola, Finland
18:00		Report	Diawara 45'	Stadium: Kymenlaakson Sähkö Stadion; Attendance: 2,275; Referee: Michael Weiner (Germany)

15 October 2003 Second leg	Sochaux (France)	2–0 (3–0 agg.)	(Finland) MyPa	Sochaux, France
19:15	Monsoreau 58'; Santos 82'	Report		Stadium: Stade Auguste Bonal; Attendance: 8,885; Referee: Selçuk Dereli (Turkey)

==== Second round ====
6 November 2003 First leg	Borussia Dortmund (Germany)	2–2	(France) Sochaux	Dortmund, Germany
20:30	Senesie 68'; Ewerthon 78'	Report	Santos 12'; Frau 27'	Stadium: Westfalenstadion; Attendance: 40,100; Referee: Vladimír Hriňák (Slovakia)

27 November 2003 Second leg	Sochaux (France)	4–0 (6–2 agg.)	(Germany) Borussia Dortmund	Sochaux, France
20:30	Frau 5' (pen.); Santos 67'; Oruma 76'; Mathieu 89'	Report		Stadium: Stade Auguste Bonal; Attendance: 18,584; Referee: Yuri Baskakov (Russia)

==== Third round ====
26 February 2004 First leg	Sochaux (France)	2–2	(Italy) Internazionale	Sochaux, France
21:00	Frau 59', 81'	Report	Vieri 8'; Recoba 61'	Stadium: Stade Auguste Bonal; Attendance: 19,561; Referee: Luis Medina Cantalejo (Spain)

3 March 2004 Second leg	Internazionale (Italy)	0–0 (2 (a)–2 agg.)	(France) Sochaux	Milan, Italy
20:45		Report		Stadium: San Siro; Attendance: 15,883; Referee: Steve Bennett (England)
