= 2002–03 FC Sochaux-Montbéliard season =

Sochaux
2002–03 season
- President: Jean-Claude Plessis
- Manager: Guy Lacombe
- Stadium: Stade Auguste Bonal
- Ligue 1: 5th
- Coupe de France: Round of 64
- Coupe de la Ligue: Runners-up
- UEFA Intertoto Cup: Semi-finals
- Top goalscorer: League: Pierre-Alain Frau; Mickaël Pagis (9 each); All: Pierre-Alain Frau (15)
- Average home league attendance: 15,304

The 2002–03 season was the 74th season in the existence of FC Sochaux-Montbéliard and the club's second consecutive season in the top flight of French football. In addition to the domestic league, Sochaux participated in this season's editions of the Coupe de France, Coupe de la Ligue, and UEFA Intertoto Cup. The season covered the period from 1 July 2002 to 30 June 2003.

== First-team squad ==
Squad at end of season

Note: Flags indicate national team as defined under FIFA eligibility rules; some limited exceptions apply. Players may hold more than one non-FIFA nationality.

No.	Pos.	Nation	Player
1	GK	CIV	Gérard Gnanhouan
2	DF	SEN	Ibrahim Tall
3	DF	FRA	William Quevedo
4	DF	FRA	Maxence Flachez
5	DF	SCG	Niša Saveljić
6	MF	SUI	Johann Lonfat
7	MF	TUN	Adel Chedli
8	MF	FRA	Fabien Boudarène
9	FW	FRA	Mickaël Pagis
10	MF	NGA	Wilson Oruma
11	MF	FRA	Stéphane Crucet
12	MF	FRA	Mickaël Isabey
13	FW	FRA	Pierre-Alain Frau
14	FW	TUN	Francileudo Santos
15	DF	FRA	Laurent Charvet

No.	Pos.	Nation	Player
16	GK	FRA	Teddy Richert
17	MF	FRA	Benoît Pedretti
18	DF	CIV	Jean-Jacques Domoraud
19	DF	FRA	Philippe Raschke
20	DF	FRA	Erwan Manach
23	MF	FRA	Kamal Tassali
24	DF	FRA	Sylvain Monsoreau
25	MF	FRA	Jérémy Mathieu
26	FW	SEN	Basile De Carvalho
27	DF	SEN	Omar Daf
28	MF	ARG	Marcelo Trapasso
29	FW	MAR	Jaouad Zaïri
30	GK	FRA	Jean-Baptiste Daguet
33	MF	FRA	Virgile Boumelaha

== Competitions ==
=== Overview ===
Competition	First match	Last match	Starting round	Final position	Record							
Competition	First match	Last match	Starting round	Final position	Pld	W	D	L	GF	GA	GD	Win %
Ligue 1	3 August 2002	24 May 2003	Matchday 1	5th	38	17	13	8	46	31	+15	44.74
Coupe de France	4 January 2003		Round of 64	Round of 64	1	0	0	1	1	2	−1	0.00
Coupe de la Ligue	7 December 2003	17 May 2003	First round	Runners-up	5	3	1	1	11	9	+2	60.00
UEFA Intertoto Cup	6 July 2002	7 August 2002	Second round	Semi-finals	6	3	1	2	7	4	+3	50.00
Total					50	23	15	12	65	46	+19	46.00

Source: Competitions

=== Ligue 1 ===
==== League table ====
Pos	Team	Pld	W	D	L	GF	GA	GD	Pts	Qualification or relegation
3	Marseille	38	19	8	11	41	36	+5	65	Qualification to Champions League third qualifying round
4	Bordeaux	38	18	10	10	57	36	+21	64	Qualification to UEFA Cup first round
5	Sochaux	38	17	13	8	46	31	+15	64	Qualification to UEFA Cup first round
6	Auxerre	38	18	10	10	38	29	+9	64	Qualification to UEFA Cup first round
7	Guingamp	38	19	5	14	59	46	+13	62	Qualification to Intertoto Cup third round

Source: Ligue 1
Rules for classification: 1) points; 2) goal difference; 3) number of goals scored.

==== Results summary ====
Overall								Home						Away					
Pld	W	D	L	GF	GA	GD	Pts	W	D	L	GF	GA	GD	W	D	L	GF	GA	GD
38	17	13	8	46	31	+15	64	12	7	0	28	8	+20	5	6	8	18	23	−5

==== Results by round ====
Round	1	2	3	4	5	6	7	8	9	10	11	12	13	14	15	16	17	18	19	20	21	22	23	24	25	26	27	28	29	30	31	32	33	34	35	36	37	38
Ground	A	A	H	A	H	A	H	A	H	A	H	A	H	A	H	A	H	A	H	H	A	H	A	H	A	H	A	H	A	H	A	H	A	H	A	H	A	H
Result	D	D	W	L	W	D	D	W	W	L	W	L	W	D	D	L	W	L	W	W	W	D	L	W	L	D	D	W	L	D	W	D	W	D	W	W	D	W
Position	14	13	7	11	8	7	10	7	5	6	5	7	6	6	5	8	6	8	7	6	3	4	5	3	7	7	6	5	7	8	5	7	5	5	5	5	5	5

A = Away; H = Home; W = Win; D = Draw; L = Loss

==== Matches ====
3 August 2002 1	Sedan	0–0	Sochaux	Sedan
20:00				Stadium: Stade Louis Dugauguez; Attendance: 13,204

10 August 2002 2	Lens	1–1	Sochaux	Lens
17:15				Stadium: Stade Bollaert-Delelis; Attendance: 36,971

17 August 2002 3	Sochaux	4–2	Nantes	Montbéliard
20:00				Stadium: Stade Auguste Bonal; Attendance: 14,433

24 August 2002 4	Monaco	1–0	Sochaux	Monaco
20:00				Stadium: Stade Louis II; Attendance: 8,536

31 August 2002 5	Sochaux	2–1	Lyon	Montbéliard
20:00				Stadium: Stade Auguste Bonal; Attendance: 18,442

11 September 2002 6	Rennes	2–2	Sochaux	Rennes
20:30				Stadium: Stade de la Route de Lorient; Attendance: 15,856

14 September 2002 7	Sochaux	1–1	Auxerre	Montbéliard
20:00				Stadium: Stade Auguste Bonal; Attendance: 18,352

21 September 2002 8	Ajaccio	0–1	Sochaux	Ajaccio
20:00				Stadium: Stade François Coty; Attendance: 5,272

28 September 2002 9	Sochaux	1–0	Nice	Montbéliard
20:00				Stadium: Stade Auguste Bonal; Attendance: 15,457

5 October 2002 10	Le Havre	1–0	Sochaux	Le Havre
20:00				Stadium: Stade Jules Deschaseaux; Attendance: 8,779

19 October 2002 11	Sochaux	2–0	Bordeaux	Montbéliard
20:00				Stadium: Stade Auguste Bonal; Attendance: 19,082

26 October 2002 12	Lille	1–0	Sochaux	Lille
20:00				Stadium: Stade Grimonprez-Jooris; Attendance: 14,981

2 November 2002 13	Sochaux	2–0	Strasbourg	Montbéliard
20:00				Stadium: Stade Auguste Bonal; Attendance: 18,555

9 November 2002 14	Paris Saint-Germain	1–1	Sochaux	Paris
20:00				Stadium: Parc des Princes; Attendance: 40,992

16 November 2002 15	Sochaux	0–0	Montpellier	Montbéliard
20:00				Stadium: Stade Auguste Bonal; Attendance: 17,788

23 November 2002 16	Guingamp	2–0	Sochaux	Paris
20:00				Stadium: Stade de Roudourou; Attendance: 14,325

30 November 2002 17	Sochaux	1–0	Troyes	Montbéliard
20:00				Stadium: Stade Auguste Bonal; Attendance: 12,163

4 December 2002 18	Marseille	1–0	Sochaux	Marseille
20:30				Stadium: Stade Vélodrome; Attendance: 45,293

14 December 2002 19	Sochaux	2–0	Bastia	Montbéliard
20:00				Stadium: Stade Auguste Bonal; Attendance: 10,934

20 December 2002 20	Sochaux	3–0	Lens	Montbéliard
20:00				Stadium: Stade Auguste Bonal; Attendance: 12,686

15 January 2003 22	Sochaux	0–0	Monaco	Montbéliard
18:00				Stadium: Stade Auguste Bonal; Attendance: 11,655

22 January 2003 23	Lyon	4–1	Sochaux	Lyon
18:00				Stadium: Stade de Gerland; Attendance: 30,662

29 January 2003 24	Sochaux	1–0	Rennes	Montbéliard
20:30				Stadium: Stade Auguste Bonal; Attendance: 10,471

1 February 2003 25	Auxerre	2–0	Sochaux	Auxerre
17:30				Stadium: Stade de l'Abbé Deschamps; Attendance: 6,488

8 February 2003 27	Nice	2–2	Sochaux	Nice
20:00				Stadium: Stade du Ray; Attendance: 14,078

15 February 2003 21	Nantes	0–1	Sochaux	Nantes
17:30				Stadium: Stade de La Beaujoire; Attendance: 29,670

22 February 2003 28	Sochaux	1–0	Le Havre	Montbéliard
20:00				Stadium: Stade Auguste Bonal; Attendance: 12,418

1 March 2003 29	Bordeaux	2–0	Sochaux	Bordeaux
17:30				Stadium: Stade Chaban-Delmas; Attendance: 25,368

8 March 2003 30	Sochaux	2–2	Lille	Montbéliard
20:00				Stadium: Stade Auguste Bonal; Attendance: 12,818

14 March 2003 26	Sochaux	1–1	Ajaccio	Montbéliard
20:30				Stadium: Stade Auguste Bonal; Attendance: 13,343

22 March 2003 31	Strasbourg	1–3	Sochaux	Strasbourg
20:00				Stadium: Stade de la Meinau; Attendance: 12,549

5 April 2003 32	Sochaux	0–0	Paris Saint-Germain	Montbéliard
20:00				Stadium: Stade Auguste Bonal; Attendance: 19,682

12 April 2003 33	Montpellier	0–2	Sochaux	Montpellier
20:00				Stadium: Stade de la Mosson; Attendance: 12,177

19 April 2003 34	Sochaux	0–0	Guingamp	Montbéliard
20:00				Stadium: Stade Auguste Bonal; Attendance: 17,563

3 May 2003 35	Troyes	0–2	Sochaux	Troyes
20:00				Stadium: Stade de l'Aube; Attendance: 11,597

10 May 2003 36	Sochaux	3–0	Marseille	Montbéliard
20:00				Stadium: Stade Auguste Bonal; Attendance: 19,910

20 May 2003 37	Bastia	2–2	Sochaux	Furiani
20:30				Stadium: Stade Armand Cesari; Attendance: 7,943

24 May 2003 38	Sochaux	2–1	Sedan	Montbéliard
20:00				Stadium: Stade Auguste Bonal; Attendance: 19,078

=== Coupe de France ===
4 January 2003 Round of 64	Grenoble	2–1	Sochaux	Grenoble
15:30				Stadium: Stade Lesdiguières; Attendance: 10,000; Referee: Pascal Viléo

=== Coupe de la Ligue ===
7 December 2002 Third round	Sochaux	3–0	Ajaccio	Montbéliard
18:00 CET (UTC+1)				Stadium: Stade Auguste Bonal; Attendance: 6,121

18 January 2003 Round of 16	Sochaux	3–3 (a.e.t.) (4–3 p)	Lyon	Montbéliard
17:00 CET (UTC+1)				Stadium: Stade Auguste Bonal; Attendance: 12,486; Referee: Stéphane Bré

5 March 2003 Quarter-finals	Sochaux	1–0 (a.e.t.)	Lille	Montbéliard
20:30 CET (UTC+1)	Monsoreau 105'			Stadium: Stade Auguste Bonal; Attendance: 16,124; Referee: Éric Poulat

15 April 2003 Semi-finals	Sochaux	3–2 (a.e.t.)	Metz	Montbéliard
21:00 CEST (UTC+2)	Frau 47', 69'; Monsoreau 99'		Proment 27'; Niang 87'	Stadium: Stade Auguste Bonal; Attendance: 19,331; Referee: Laurent Duhamel

17 May 2003 Final	Sochaux	1–4	Monaco	Saint-Denis
20:45 CEST (UTC+2)				Stadium: Stade de France; Attendance: 75,379; Referee: Damien Ledentu

=== UEFA Intertoto Cup ===
==== Second round ====
6 July 2002 First leg	Sochaux (France)	2–0	(Lithuania) Žalgiris	Sochaux, France
				Stadium: Stade Auguste Bonal; Attendance: 7,476

14 July 2002 Second leg	Žalgiris (Lithuania)	1–2 (1–4 agg.)	(France) Sochaux	Vilnius, Lithuania
				Stadium: Žalgiris Stadium; Attendance: 1,000

==== Third round ====
21 July 2002 First leg	Synot (Czech Republic)	0–3	(France) Sochaux	Staré Město, Czech Republic
				Stadium: Stadion Širůch; Attendance: 2,100

27 July 2002 Second leg	Sochaux (France)	0–0 (3–0 agg.)	(Czech Republic) Synot	Sochaux, France
				Stadium: Stade Auguste Bonal; Attendance: 8,843

==== Semi-finals ====
31 July 2002 First leg	Fulham (England)	1–0	(France) Sochaux	London, England
20:45				Stadium: Craven Cottage; Attendance: 4,717

7 August 2002 Second leg	Sochaux (France)	0–2 (0–3 agg.)	(England) Fulham	Sochaux, France
19:30				Stadium: Stade Auguste Bonal; Attendance: 11,000
