= 2002–03 Olympique Lyonnais season =

Lyon
2002–03 season
- Owner: OL Groupe
- President: Jean-Michel Aulas
- Head coach: Paul Le Guen
- Stadium: Stade de Gerland
- Ligue 1: 1st (champions)
- Coupe de France: Round of 64
- Coupe de la Ligue: Round of 16
- Trophée des Champions: Winners
- Champions League: Group stage
- UEFA Cup: Third round
- Top goalscorer: League: Juninho (13); All: Sonny Anderson (17)
- Average home league attendance: 36,733
Home colours	Away colours	Third colours

The 2002–03 season was the 104th season in the existence of Olympique Lyonnais and the club's 14th consecutive season in the top flight of French football. They participated in the Ligue 1, the Coupe de France, the Coupe de la Ligue, the Trophée des Champions, UEFA Champions League and UEFA Cup.

== First-team squad ==
Squad at end of season

Note: Flags indicate national team as defined under FIFA eligibility rules; some limited exceptions apply. Players may hold more than one non-FIFA nationality.

No.	Pos.	Nation	Player
1	GK	FRA	Grégory Coupet
2	DF	BEL	Eric Deflandre
3	DF	BRA	Edmílson
5	DF	BRA	Caçapa
6	MF	FRA	Philippe Violeau
7	MF	MLI	Mahamadou Diarra
8	MF	BRA	Juninho Pernambucano
9	FW	BRA	Sonny Anderson (captain)
10	MF	FRA	Eric Carrière
13	DF	FRA	Jérémie Bréchet
14	FW	FRA	Sidney Govou
15	DF	BEL	Christophe Delmotte
18	FW	FRA	Péguy Luyindula
19	DF	FRA	Jean-Marc Chanelet
20	DF	SUI	Patrick Müller
21	FW	FRA	Frédéric Née
23	MF	FRA	Florent Balmont

No.	Pos.	Nation	Player
24	MF	FRA	Vikash Dhorasoo
25	GK	FRA	Rémy Vercoutre
27	MF	FRA	Alexandre Hauw
29	MF	FRA	Yohan Gomez
30	GK	FRA	Nicolas Puydebois
31	DF	FRA	Romain Sartre
32	MF	FRA	Bryan Bergougnoux
34	FW	FRA	Julien Viale
35	GK	FRA	Steve Legalle
36	DF	FRA	Alexis Genet
37	FW	FRA	Demba Touré
38	DF	FRA	Jérémy Berthod
39	FW	FRA	Kevin Jacmot
40	DF	FRA	Jamel Alioui
41	DF	FRA	Johan Truchet
42	DF	FRA	Gaël Genevier

=== Left club during season ===
Note: Flags indicate national team as defined under FIFA eligibility rules; some limited exceptions apply. Players may hold more than one non-FIFA nationality.

No.	Pos.	Nation	Player
4	DF	FRA	Florent Laville (on loan to Bolton Wanderers)
11	FW	FRA	Tony Vairelles (on loan to Lens)
17	MF	CMR	Marc-Vivien Foé (on loan to Manchester City)
28	MF	FRA	Laurent Montoya (on loan to Lorient)

== Competitions ==
=== Overview ===
Competition	First match	Last match	Starting round	Final position	Record							
Competition	First match	Last match	Starting round	Final position	Pld	W	D	L	GF	GA	GD	Win %
Ligue 1	2 August 2002	24 May 2003	Matchday 1	Winners	38	19	11	8	63	41	+22	50.00
Coupe de France	4 January 2003		Round of 64	Round of 64	1	0	0	1	0	1	−1	0.00
Coupe de la Ligue	7 December 2002	18 January 2003	Round of 32	Round of 16	2	1	1	0	5	3	+2	50.00
Trophée des Champions	27 July 2002		Final	Winners	1	1	0	0	5	1	+4	100.00
UEFA Champions League	17 September 2002	12 November 2002	Group stage	Group stage	6	2	2	2	12	9	+3	33.33
UEFA Cup	28 November 2002	12 December 2002	Third round	Third round	2	0	1	1	0	1	−1	0.00
Total					50	23	15	12	85	56	+29	46.00

Source: Competitions

=== Trophée des Champions ===
27 July 2002 Final	Lyon	5–1	Lorient	Cannes
20:45 CEST (UTC+2)	Govou 8', 25', 74'; Dhorasoo 40'; Luyindula 79'		Loko 27'	Stadium: Stade Pierre de Coubertin; Attendance: 5,041; Referee: Bruno Coué

=== Ligue 1 ===
==== League table ====
Pos	Team	Pld	W	D	L	GF	GA	GD	Pts	Qualification or relegation
1	Lyon (C)	38	19	11	8	63	41	+22	68	Qualification to Champions League group stage
2	Monaco	38	19	10	9	66	33	+33	67	Qualification to Champions League group stage
3	Marseille	38	19	8	11	41	36	+5	65	Qualification to Champions League third qualifying round
4	Bordeaux	38	18	10	10	57	36	+21	64	Qualification to UEFA Cup first round
5	Sochaux	38	17	13	8	46	31	+15	64	Qualification to UEFA Cup first round

Source: Ligue 1
Rules for classification: 1) points; 2) goal difference; 3) number of goals scored.
(C) Champions

==== Results summary ====
Overall								Home						Away					
Pld	W	D	L	GF	GA	GD	Pts	W	D	L	GF	GA	GD	W	D	L	GF	GA	GD
38	19	11	8	63	41	+22	68	12	5	2	40	19	+21	7	6	6	23	22	+1

Source: Ligue 1

==== Results by round ====
Round	1	2	3	4	5	6	7	8	9	10	11	12	13	14	15	16	17	18	19	20	21	22	23	24	25	26	27	28	29	30	31	32	33	34	35	36	37	38
Ground	A	H	A	H	A	H	A	H	A	A	H	A	H	A	H	A	H	A	H	A	H	A	H	A	H	A	H	H	A	H	A	H	A	H	A	H	A	H
Result	D	W	D	W	L	W	L	L	D	W	W	W	D	W	W	L	W	L	D	D	W	L	W	D	D	L	D	W	W	W	W	W	W	D	W	W	D	L
Position	7	2	6	3	5	3	6	10	10	9	6	4	5	2	2	2	1	2	4	5	2	5	2	2	5	5	5	4	3	3	3	1	1	2	1	1	1	1

Source: Ligue 1
A = Away; H = Home; W = Win; D = Draw; L = Loss

==== Matches ====
2 August 2002 1	Guingamp	3–3	Lyon	Guingamp
20:45 CEST (UTC+2)	Carnot 24'; Bardon 89'; Drogba 90+4'	Report	Juninho 3'; Chanelet 38'; Anderson 51'	Stadium: Stade de Roudourou; Attendance: 14,353; Referee: Philippe Kalt

10 August 2002 2	Lyon	6–1	Sedan	Lyon
20:00 CEST (UTC+2)	Juninho 45', 69'; Caçapa 47'; Anderson 59', 80'; Luyindula 90'	Report	H. Camara 8'	Stadium: Stade de Gerland; Attendance: 36,918; Referee: Améziane Khendek

16 August 2002 3	Marseille	1–1	Lyon	Marseille
20:45 CEST (UTC+2)	Bakayoko 29'	Report	Govou 14'	Stadium: Stade Vélodrome; Attendance: 56,529; Referee: Laurent Duhamel

24 August 2002 4	Lyon	4–1	Bastia	Lyon
20:00 CEST (UTC+2)	Anderson 19', 36', 63'; Carrière 87'	Report	Ahamada 23'	Stadium: Stade de Gerland; Attendance: 38,777; Referee: Stéphane Bré

31 August 2002 5	Sochaux	2–1	Lyon	Montbéliard
20:00 CEST (UTC+2)	Monsoreau 69'; Pagis 88'	Report	Saveljić 88' (o.g.)	Stadium: Stade Auguste Bonal; Attendance: 18,442; Referee: Alain Sars

10 September 2002 6	Lyon	1–0	Lens	Lyon
20:45 CEST (UTC+2)	Juninho 32'	Report		Stadium: Stade de Gerland; Attendance: 33,737; Referee: Damien Ledentu

14 September 2002 7	Nantes	1–0	Lyon	Nantes
20:00 CEST (UTC+2)	Vahirua 19'	Report		Stadium: Stade de la Beaujoire; Attendance: 33,444; Referee: Hervé Piccirillo

21 September 2002 8	Lyon	1–3	Monaco	Lyon
17:15 CEST (UTC+2)	Laville 54'	Report	Nonda 14'; Giuly 52'; S. Camara 90'	Stadium: Stade de Gerland; Attendance: 38,392; Referee: Alain Sars

28 September 2002 9	Troyes	1–1	Lyon	Troyes
20:00 CET (UTC+1)	Niang 85'	Report	Dhorasoo 74'	Stadium: Stade de l'Aube; Attendance: 11,592; Referee: Claude Colombo

5 October 2002 10	Rennes	0–1	Lyon	Rennes
20:00 CEST (UTC+2)		Report	Govou 50'	Stadium: Stade de la Route de Lorient; Attendance: 18,480; Referee: Laurent Duhamel

19 October 2002 11	Lyon	3–0	Auxerre	Lyon
17:15 CEST (UTC+2)	Juninho 36', 51', 75'	Report		Stadium: Stade de Gerland; Attendance: 40,188; Referee: Bruno Coué

26 October 2002 12	Ajaccio	0–1	Lyon	Ajaccio
20:00 CEST (UTC+2)		Report	Vairelles 32'	Stadium: Stade François Coty; Attendance: 6,415; Referee: Bertrand Layec

2 November 2002 13	Lyon	2–2	Nice	Lyon
17:15 CET (UTC+1)	Anderson 48'; Delmotte 66'	Report	Diawara 40'; Abardonado 90+3'	Stadium: Stade de Gerland; Attendance: 37,511; Referee: Stéphane Bré

7 November 2002 14	Le Havre	1–2	Lyon	Le Havre
20:00 CEST (UTC+2)	Le Tallec 58'	Report	Carrière 11'; Caçapa 86'	Stadium: Stade Jules Deschaseaux; Attendance: 12,645; Referee: Patrick Lhermite

16 November 2002 15	Lyon	4–2	Bordeaux	Lyon
20:00 CET (UTC+1)	Govou 1'; Luyindula 46', 49'; Vairelles 54'	Report	Sahnoun 17'; Sommeil 31'	Stadium: Stade de Gerland; Attendance: 38,809; Referee: Gilles Veissière

23 November 2002 16	Lille	2–1	Lyon	Lille
20:00 CET (UTC+1)	Manchev 68'; Landrin 73'	Report	Née 90+1'	Stadium: Stade Grimonprez-Jooris; Attendance: 17,074; Referee: Alain Sars

1 December 2002 17	Lyon	2–1	Strasbourg	Lyon
18:00 CET (UTC+1)	Luyindula 33'; Diarra 48'	Report	Le Pen 22'	Stadium: Stade de Gerland; Attendance: 34,235; Referee: Bruno Derrien

4 December 2002 18	Paris Saint-Germain	2–0	Lyon	Paris
18:30 CET (UTC+1)	Heinze 37'; El Karkouri 52'	Report		Stadium: Parc des Princes; Attendance: 39,645; Referee: Stéphane Bré

15 December 2002 19	Lyon	1–1	Montpellier	Lyon
20:00 CET (UTC+1)	Carrière 55'	Report	A. Cissé 90+4'	Stadium: Stade de Gerland; Attendance: 30,059; Referee: Jean-Marc Bonnin

20 December 2002 20	Sedan	1–1	Lyon	Sedan
20:30 CET (UTC+1)	H. Camara 89'	Report	Anderson 47'	Stadium: Stade Louis Dugauguez; Attendance: 13,870; Referee: Bertrand Layec

10 January 2003 21	Lyon	1–0	Marseille	Lyon
20:45 CET (UTC+1)	Luyindula 41'	Report		Stadium: Stade de Gerland; Attendance: 38,775; Referee: Pierluigi Collina (Italy)

15 January 2003 22	Bastia	2–0	Lyon	Furiani
20:30 CET (UTC+1)	Essien 65'; Maurice 80'	Report		Stadium: Stade Armand Cesari; Attendance: 6,516; Referee: Pascal Viléo

22 January 2003 23	Lyon	4–1	Sochaux	Lyon
18:00 CET (UTC+1)	Luyindula 27', 43'; Juninho 38'; Charvet 48' (o.g.)	Report	Pagis 71'	Stadium: Stade de Gerland; Attendance: 30,662; Referee: Pascal Garibian

29 January 2003 24	Lens	2–2	Lyon	Lens
20:30 CET (UTC+1)	Sibierski 19' (pen.), 44'	Report	Dhorasoo 26'; Carrière 43'	Stadium: Stade Félix-Bollaert; Attendance: 36,787; Referee: Stéphane Moulin

1 February 2003 25	Lyon	0–0	Nantes	Lyon
20:00 CET (UTC+1)		Report		Stadium: Stade de Gerland; Attendance: 33,227; Referee: Philippe Kalt

4 February 2003 26	Monaco	2–0	Lyon	Monaco
20:45 CET (UTC+1)	Pršo 30'; Nonda 64'	Report		Stadium: Stade Louis II; Attendance: 8,203; Referee: Bertrand Layec

8 February 2003 27	Lyon	0–0	Troyes	Lyon
20:00 CET (UTC+1)		Report		Stadium: Stade de Gerland; Attendance: 32,019; Referee: Hervé Piccirillo

22 February 2003 28	Lyon	4–1	Rennes	Lyon
20:00 CET (UTC+1)	Juninho 16'; Luyindula 44', 73'; Govou 62'	Report	Delaye 20'	Stadium: Stade de Gerland; Attendance: 37,962; Referee: Bruno Derrien

2 March 2003 29	Auxerre	1–2	Lyon	Auxerre
20:45 CET (UTC+1)	D. Cissé 90'	Report	Govou 5'; Luyindula 35'	Stadium: Stade de l'Abbé-Deschamps; Attendance: 10,183; Referee: Stéphane Bré

8 March 2003 30	Lyon	3–1	Ajaccio	Lyon
20:00 CET (UTC+1)	Juninho 9', 40'; Anderson 85'	Report	Lacombe 33'	Stadium: Stade de Gerland; Attendance: 38,946; Referee: Stéphane Lannoy

23 March 2003 31	Nice	0–1	Lyon	Nice
20:45 CET (UTC+1)		Report	Juninho 84'	Stadium: Stade du Ray; Attendance: 14,308; Referee: Alain Sars

5 April 2003 32	Lyon	2–1	Le Havre	Lyon
17:15 CEST (UTC+2)	Govou 37'; Carrière 84'	Report	Lesage 42'	Stadium: Stade de Gerland; Attendance: 39,652; Referee: Thierry Auriac

11 April 2003 33	Bordeaux	0–1	Lyon	Bordeaux
20:45 CET (UTC+1)		Report	Anderson 61'	Stadium: Stade Chaban-Delmas; Attendance: 32,175; Referee: Stéphane Bré

19 April 2003 34	Lyon	0–0	Lille	Lyon
20:00 CEST (UTC+2)		Report		Stadium: Stade de Gerland; Attendance: 40,083; Referee: Claude Colombo

3 May 2003 35	Strasbourg	0–4	Lyon	Strasbourg
20:00 CET (UTC+1)		Report	Anderson 4'; Carrière 59'; Luyindula 64'; Violeau 78'	Stadium: Stade de la Meinau; Attendance: 20,471; Referee: Bertrand Layec

11 May 2003 36	Lyon	1–0	Paris Saint-Germain	Lyon
21:00 CEST (UTC+2)	Anderson 25'	Report		Stadium: Stade de Gerland; Attendance: 37,823; Referee: Laurent Duhamel

20 May 2003 37	Montpellier	1–1	Lyon	Montpellier
20:30 CET (UTC+1)	Bamogo 12'	Report	Juninho 25'	Stadium: Stade de la Mosson; Attendance: 19,764; Referee: Gilles Veissière

24 May 2003 38	Lyon	1–4	Guingamp	Lyon
20:30 CEST (UTC+2)	Govou 65'	Report	Drogba 18', 67'; Malouda 19', 46'	Stadium: Stade de Gerland; Attendance: 40,152; Referee: Bruno Derrien

=== Coupe de France ===
4 January 2003 Round of 64	Libourne-Saint-Seurin	1–0	Lyon	Libourne
20:00 CET (UTC+1)	Castant 76'			Stadium: Stade Jean-Antoine Moueix; Attendance: 8,500; Referee: Thierry Auriac

=== Coupe de la Ligue ===
7 December 2002 Round of 32	Lyon	2–0	Bastia	Lyon
20:45 CET (UTC+1)	Luyindula 33', 81'			Stadium: Stade de Gerland; Attendance: 2,032; Referee: Claude Colombo

18 January 2003 Round of 16	Sochaux	3–3 (a.e.t.) (4–3 p)	Lyon	Montbéliard
17:00 CET (UTC+1)	Santos 4', 8', 75'		Govou 44', 49'; Luyindula 47'	Stadium: Stade Auguste Bonal; Attendance: 12,486; Referee: Stéphane Bré
	Penalties
	Saveljić (penalty scored); Frau (penalty scored); Oruma (penalty scored); Pagis (penalty scored); Isabey (penalty scored)		(penalty scored) Müller; (penalty scored) Carrière; (penalty scored) Luyindula; (penalty missed) Edmílson

=== UEFA Champions League ===
==== Group stage ====
Pos	Team	Pld	W	D	L	GF	GA	GD	Pts	Qualification
1	(Italy) Internazionale	6	3	2	1	12	8	+4	11	Advance to second group stage
2	(Netherlands) Ajax	6	2	2	2	6	5	+1	8	Advance to second group stage
3	(France) Lyon	6	2	2	2	12	9	+3	8	Transfer to UEFA Cup
4	(Norway) Rosenborg	6	0	4	2	4	12	−8	4	

Source: RSSSF

17 September 2002 1	Ajax (Netherlands)	2–1	(France) Lyon	Amsterdam, Netherlands
20:45 CEST (UTC+2)	Ibrahimović 11', 34'	Report	Anderson 84'	Stadium: Amsterdam Arena; Attendance: 37,104; Referee: Mike Riley (England)

25 September 2002 2	Lyon (France)	5–0	(Norway) Rosenborg	Lyon, France
20:45 CEST (UTC+2)	Carrière 6'; Vairelles 26', 45'; Anderson 34'; Luyindula 75'	Report		Stadium: Stade de Gerland; Attendance: 37,505; Referee: Franz-Xaver Wack (Germany)

2 October 2002 3	Internazionale (Italy)	1–2	(France) Lyon	Milan, Italy
20:45 CEST (UTC+2)	Cannavaro 73'	Report	Govou 21'; Anderson 60'	Stadium: San Siro; Attendance: 31,448; Referee: Manuel Mejuto González (Spain)

22 October 2002 4	Lyon (France)	3–3	(Italy) Internazionale	Lyon, France
20:45 CEST (UTC+2)	Anderson 21', 75'; Carrière 44'	Report	Caçapa 31' (o.g.); Crespo 56', 66'	Stadium: Stade de Gerland; Attendance: 37,770; Referee: Kim Milton Nielsen (Denmark)

30 October 2002 5	Lyon (France)	0–2	(Netherlands) Ajax	Lyon, France
20:45 CET (UTC+1)		Report	Pienaar 7'; Van der Vaart 90+3'	Stadium: Stade de Gerland; Attendance: 38,134; Referee: Kyros Vassaras (Greece)

12 November 2002 6	Rosenborg (Norway)	1–1	(France) Lyon	Trondheim, Norway
20:45 CET (UTC+1)	Brattbakk 69'	Report	Govou 84'	Stadium: Lerkendal Stadion; Attendance: 21,008; Referee: Hugh Dallas (Scotland)

=== UEFA Cup ===
==== Third round ====
28 November 2002 First leg	Denizlispor (Turkey)	0–0	(France) Lyon	Denizli, Turkey
19:00 EET (UTC+2)		Report		Stadium: Atatürk Stadium; Attendance: 10,488; Referee: Rune Pedersen (Norway)

12 December 2002 Second leg	Lyon (France)	0–1 (0–1 agg.)	(Turkey) Denizlispor	Lyon, France
18:00 CET (UTC+1)		Report	Özkan 6'	Stadium: Stade de Gerland; Attendance: 34,564; Referee: Leslie Irvine (Northern Ireland)
