= 2004 Coupe de la Ligue final =

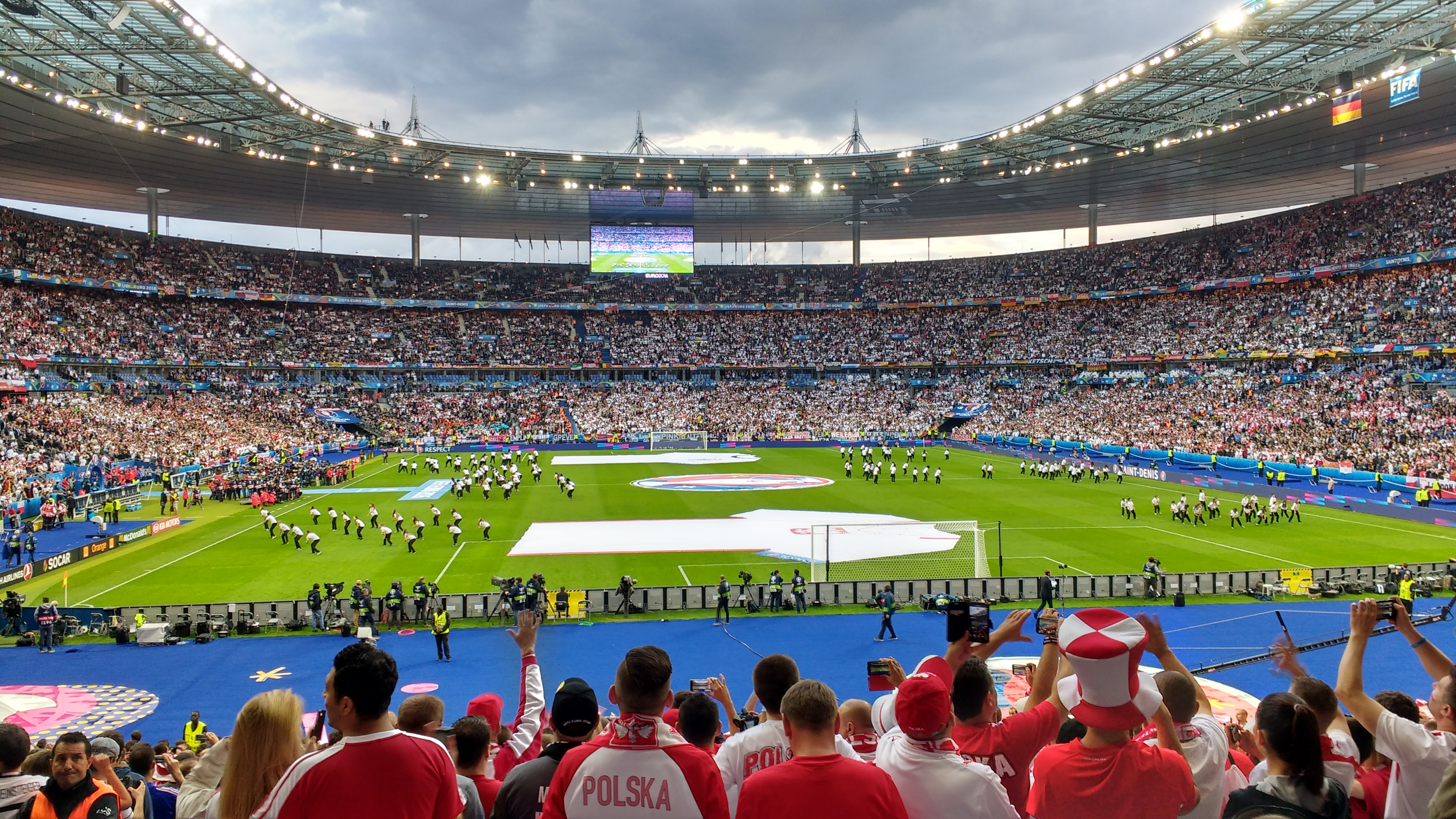
- Event: 2003–04 Coupe de la Ligue
Nantes	Sochaux
Ligue 1	Ligue 1
1	1
- After extra time Sochaux won 5–4 on penalties
- Date: 17 April 2004
- Venue: Stade de France, Saint-Denis
- Referee: Pascal Garibian
- Attendance: 78,409

The 2004 Coupe de la Ligue final was a football match held at Stade de France, Saint-Denis on 17 April 2004, that saw Sochaux defeat Nantes in a penalty shoot-out.

== Route to the final ==
Note: In all results below, the score of the finalist is given first (H: home; A: away).

Nantes		Round	Sochaux	
Opponent	Result	2003–04 Coupe de la Ligue	Opponent	Result
Nancy (H)	3–1 (a.e.t.)	Second round	Valence (H)	3–2 (a.e.t.)
Clermont (H)	1–0 (a.e.t.)	Round of 16	Marseille (H)	1–0
Le Mans (A)	1–1 (a.e.t.) (5–4 p)	Quarter-finals	Lens (A)	4–0
Auxerre (H)	0–0 (a.e.t.) (5–4 p)	Semi-finals	Saint-Étienne (A)	3–2 (a.e.t.)

== Match details ==
17 April 2004
20:50

Nantes	1–1 (a.e.t.)	Sochaux
Pujol 13'	Report	Monsoreau 18'
Penalties
Quint (penalty scored); Pujol (penalty missed); Yepes (penalty scored); Yapi Yapo (penalty missed); Moldovan (penalty scored); Armand (penalty scored); Landreau (penalty missed); Delhommeau (penalty missed)	4–5	(penalty scored) Frau; (penalty missed) Isabey; (penalty scored) Mathieu; (penalty scored) Pagis; (penalty missed) Lonfat; (penalty scored) Diawara; (penalty missed) Flachez; (penalty scored) Pedretti

Stade de France, Saint-Denis
Attendance: 78,409
Referee: Pascal Garibian

Nantes:
GK	1	(France) Mickaël Landreau (c)
DF	5	(France) Nicolas Gillet
DF	6	(Colombia) Mario Yepes
DF	12	(France) Pascal Delhommeau
DF	22	(France) Sylvain Armand
MF	8	(France) Frédéric Da Rocha
MF	13	(France) Mathieu Berson
MF	15	(France) Nicolas Savinaud	(substituted off) 115'
MF	35	(Ivory Coast) Emerse Faé	(substituted off) 85'
FW	28	(France) Grégory Pujol
FW	9	(Romania) Viorel Moldovan	(substituted off) 75'
Substitutes:
DF	24	(France) Loïc Guillon	(substituted on) 71'
FW	10	(Ivory Coast) Gilles Yapi Yapo	(substituted on) 85'
MF	14	(France) Olivier Quint	(substituted on) 115'
Unused substitutes:
GK	16	(France) Willy Grondin
FW	19	(French Polynesia) Marama Vahirua
Manager:
(France) Loïc Amisse Assistant Referees: Fourth Official:

Sochaux:
GK	16	(France) Teddy Richert
DF	19	(France) Philippe Raschke
DF	3	(France) Grégory Paisley
DF	4	(France) Maxence Flachez
DF	5	(France) Sylvain Monsoreau	(substituted off) 100'
DF	21	(Senegal) Souleymane Diawara
MF	25	(France) Jérémy Mathieu
MF	10	(Nigeria) Wilson Oruma	(substituted off) 60'
MF	17	(France) Benoît Pedretti (c)
FW	11	(Tunisia) Francileudo Santos	(substituted off) 96'
FW	13	(France) Pierre-Alain Frau
Substitutes:
MF	12	(France) Michaël Isabey	(substituted on) 60'
FW	9	(France) Mickaël Pagis	(substituted on) 96'
MF	14	(Switzerland) Johann Lonfat	(substituted on) 100'
Unused substitutes:
GK	1	(Ivory Coast) Gérard Gnanhouan
DF	2	(Senegal) Ibrahim Tall
Manager:
(France) Guy Lacombe

== See also ==
- 2004 Coupe de France final
- 2003–04 FC Sochaux-Montbéliard season
