= Ted Lavie =

French footballer (born 1986)

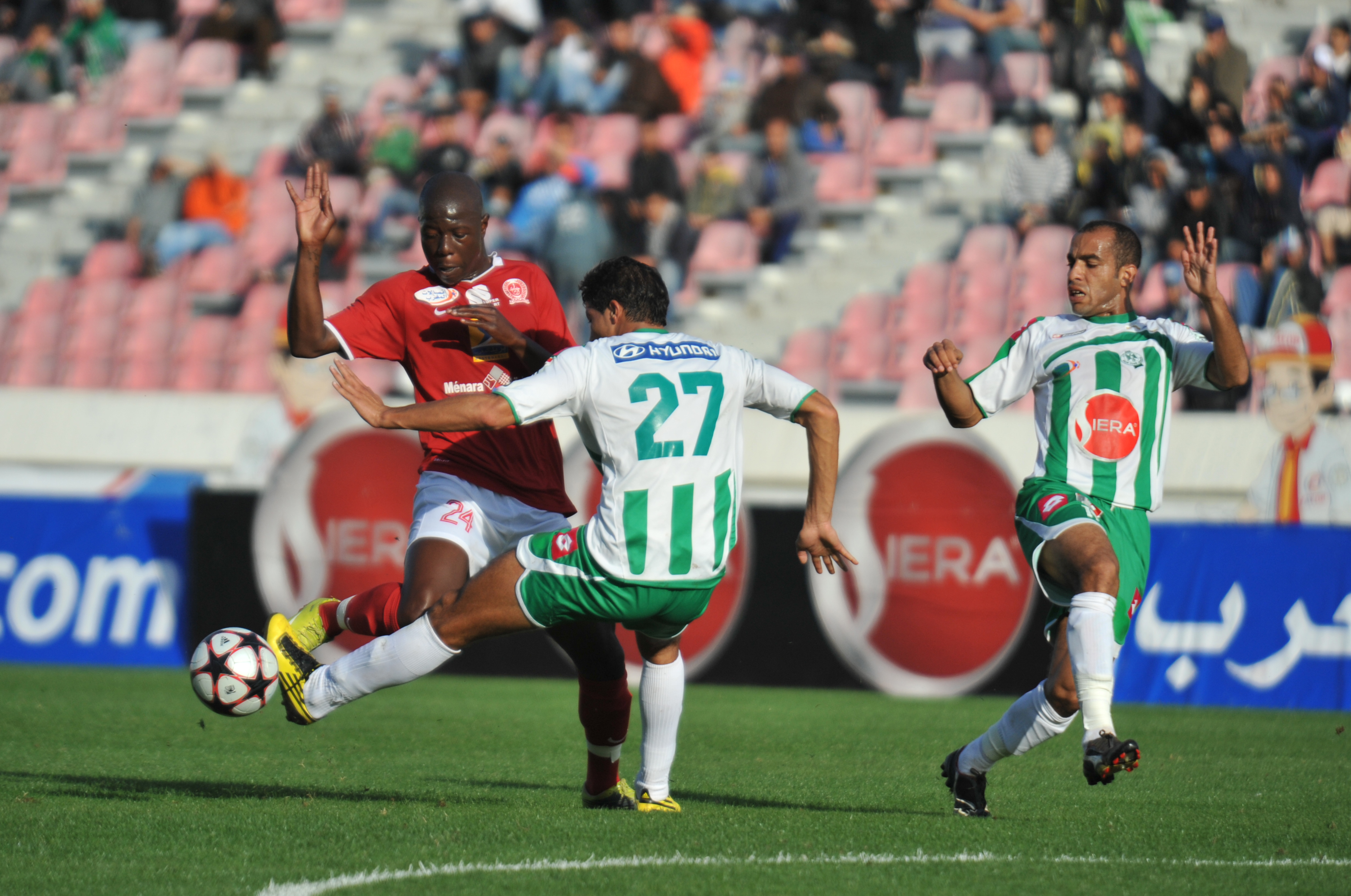
- Lavie (left) and Rachid Soulaimani

Personal information
- Full name: Ted Mondésir Lavie Mienandy
- Date of birth: 19 March 1986 (age 40)
- Place of birth: Montpellier, France
- Height: 1.78 m (5 ft 10 in)
- Position: Midfielder

Youth career
- 1999–2000: FC Brétigny-sur-Orge
- 2000–2003: Bordeaux

Senior career*
Years	Team	Apps	(Gls)
2003–2009	Bordeaux B	90	(3)
2005–2009	Bordeaux	4	(0)
2006–2007	→ Gueugnon (loan)	3	(0)
2008–2009	→ Angers (loan)	8	(0)
2009–2010	Cannes	23	(0)
2010–2012	Kawkab Marrakech		
2012–2013	Cherbourg	21	(0)
2014–2016	Stade Bordelais	40	(1)
2016–2018	Bayonne	36	(2)
2018–2020	FCE Mérignac-Arlac	27	(2)

International career
2001–2002	France U15	18	(1)
2002–2003	France U16	14	(0)
2003–2004	France U17	2	(0)
2004–2005	France U18	1	(0)
- * Club domestic league appearances and goals

Ted Mondésir Lavie Mienandy (born 19 March 1986) is a French former professional footballer who played as a midfielder.

== Career ==
Born in Montpellier, Lavie began his career with FC Brétigny-sur-Orge and was scouted by Bordeaux in summer 2000. He played three matches for Bordeaux and was loaned out to Gueugnon in summer for the 2006–07 season. After only three matches for Gueugnon he returned from his loan. In August 2008 he was loaned out to Angers. He played eight matches for Angers in the 2008–09 season. After his return to Bordeaux he was released in July 2009.

In August 2009 he signed for Cannes after trialling with the club for a few weeks.

== Personal life ==
Ted's older brother, Aimé, has also played football professionally.
