= Alexandre Hauw =

French footballer (born 1982)

Personal information
- Date of birth: 22 January 1982 (age 44)
- Place of birth: Bourgoin-Jallieu, France
- Height: 1.75 m (5 ft 9 in)
- Position: Midfielder

Senior career*
Years	Team	Apps	(Gls)
2001–2005	Lyon	4	(0)
2003–2004	→ Rouen (loan)	16	(1)
2004–2005	→ Clermont (loan)	21	(0)
2005–2008	Gueugnon	79	(7)
2008–2011	Naval	66	(2)
2011–2012	Estoril	0	(0)
2012–2013	Monts d'Or Azergues	2	(0)
Total		188	(10)
- * Club domestic league appearances and goals

Alexandre Hauw (born 22 January 1982) is a French former professional footballer who played as a midfielder.
