= Niša Saveljić =

Montenegrin footballer (born 1970)

Personal information
- Full name: Niša Saveljić
- Date of birth: 27 March 1970 (age 56)
- Place of birth: Titograd, SR Montenegro, SFR Yugoslavia
- Height: 1.88 m (6 ft 2 in)
- Position: Centre-back

Youth career
- OFK Titograd

Senior career*
Years	Team	Apps	(Gls)
1988–1993	Budućnost Podgorica	98	(8)
1993–1994	Hajduk Kula	46	(3)
1995–1997	Partizan	66	(11)
1997–2001	Bordeaux	71	(3)
2001	→ Partizan (loan)	13	(1)
2001–2003	Sochaux	57	(4)
2003	Bastia	17	(1)
2004	Guingamp	17	(1)
2004–2005	Istres	31	(1)
2005–2006	Partizan	20	(2)
Total		436	(35)

International career
1990–1991	Yugoslavia U21	7	(1)
1995–2000	FR Yugoslavia	32	(1)
Medal record
Silver medal – second place	UEFA Under-21 Championship	1990
- * Club domestic league appearances and goals

Niša Saveljić (Serbian Cyrillic: Ниша Савељић; born 27 March 1970) is a Montenegrin former footballer who played as a defender.

At international level, Saveljić represented FR Yugoslavia in one World Cup (1998) and one European Championship (2000).

== Club career ==
Born in Titograd, Saveljić made his senior debut with Budućnost in the 1988–89 campaign. He spent five seasons at the club, before surprisingly moving to Hajduk Kula in the summer of 1993. Due to his consistent performances with the club, Saveljić secured a transfer to Partizan in the 1995 winter transfer window. He won back-to-back championship titles in 1996 and 1997.

In the summer of 1997, Saveljić moved to France and signed with Bordeaux. He won the league title in his second season at the club. Afterwards, Saveljić spent another two years with Bordeaux, while also being loaned to his former club Partizan in the 2001 winter transfer window. He helped them win the 2000–01 FR Yugoslavia Cup, before returning to France. Over the next four years, Saveljić went on to play for Sochaux, Bastia, Guingamp and Istres.

In July 2005, Saveljić made another return to Partizan, signing a two-year deal. He was suspended in May 2006 for confronting with his teammate Danko Lazović after a training session. Eventually, Saveljić left the club by mutual agreement in August 2006.

== International career ==
Saveljić made his debut for FR Yugoslavia in a 3–1 win against Hong Kong on 31 January 1995. He earned 32 caps and scored one goal for the national team, having represented the country at the 1998 FIFA World Cup and UEFA Euro 2000.

== Post-playing career ==
In August 2017, Saveljić was appointed CEO of the newly founded Girondins de Bordeaux USA, as a result of a partnership between Bordeaux and Washington, D.C.–based club Olney Girls 99.

== Personal life ==
Saveljić acquired French nationality by naturalization on 15 January 2003. He is the father of water polo player Nicolas Saveljić, the older brother of the late Monteniggers member Nebojša Saveljić, and the cousin of Montenegrin international footballer Esteban Saveljich.

== Career statistics ==
=== Club ===
Appearances and goals by club, season and competition
Club	Season	League			National Cup		League Cup		Continental		Total	
Club	Season	Division	Apps	Goals	Apps	Goals	Apps	Goals	Apps	Goals	Apps	Goals
Budućnost Podgorica	1988–89	Yugoslav First League	4	0			—		—		4	0
Budućnost Podgorica	1989–90	Yugoslav First League	11	1			—		—		11	1
Budućnost Podgorica	1990–91	Yugoslav First League	31	3			—		—		31	3
Budućnost Podgorica	1991–92	Yugoslav First League	27	1			—		—		27	1
Budućnost Podgorica	1992–93	First League of FR Yugoslavia	25	3			—		—		25	3
Budućnost Podgorica	Total		98	8			—		—		98	8
Hajduk Kula	1993–94	First League of FR Yugoslavia	30	1			—		—		30	1
Hajduk Kula	1994–95	First League of FR Yugoslavia	16	2			—		—		16	2
Hajduk Kula	Total		46	3			—		—		46	3
Partizan	1994–95	First League of FR Yugoslavia	15	3	0	0	—		—		15	3
Partizan	1995–96	First League of FR Yugoslavia	24	1	8	3	—		—		32	4
Partizan	1996–97	First League of FR Yugoslavia	27	7	0	0	—		4	1	31	8
Partizan	Total		66	11	8	3	—		4	1	78	15
Bordeaux	1997–98	French Division 1	24	1	2	0	3	0	2	0	31	1
Bordeaux	1998–99	French Division 1	25	0	1	0	0	0	8	0	34	0
Bordeaux	1999–2000	French Division 1	21	2	5	0	1	0	8	0	35	2
Bordeaux	2000–01	French Division 1	1	0	1	0	1	0	2	0	5	0
Bordeaux	Total		71	3	9	0	5	0	20	0	105	3
Partizan (loan)	2000–01	First League of FR Yugoslavia	13	1	3	0	—		0	0	16	1
Sochaux	2001–02	French Division 1	24	2	2	0	1	0	—		27	2
Sochaux	2002–03	Ligue 1	33	2	1	0	5	1	6	0	45	3
Sochaux	Total		57	4	3	0	6	1	6	0	72	5
Bastia	2003–04	Ligue 1	17	1	1	0	2	0	—		20	1
Guingamp	2003–04	Ligue 1	17	1	0	0	0	0	0	0	17	1
Istres	2004–05	Ligue 1	31	1	1	0	1	0	—		33	1
Partizan	2005–06	Serbia and Montenegro SuperLiga	19	2	0	0	—		0	0	19	2
Partizan	2006–07	Serbian SuperLiga	1	0	0	0	—		0	0	1	0
Partizan	Total		20	2	0	0	—		0	0	20	2
Career total			436	35	25	3	14	1	30	1	505	40

=== International ===
Appearances and goals by national team and year
National team	Year	Apps	Goals
FR Yugoslavia	1995	5	1
FR Yugoslavia	1996	5	0
FR Yugoslavia	1997	5	0
FR Yugoslavia	1998	7	0
FR Yugoslavia	1999	3	0
FR Yugoslavia	2000	7	0
Total		32	1

== Honours ==
=== Club ===
Partizan

- First League of FR Yugoslavia: 1995–96, 1996–97
- FR Yugoslavia Cup: 2000–01

Bordeaux

- French Division 1: 1998–99
- Coupe de la Ligue: Runner-up 1997–98
- Trophée des Champions: Runner-up 1999

Sochaux

- Coupe de la Ligue: Runner-up 2002–03

=== International ===
Yugoslavia

- UEFA Under-21 Championship: Runner-up 1990
