= Jérémy Mathieu =

French footballer (born 1983)

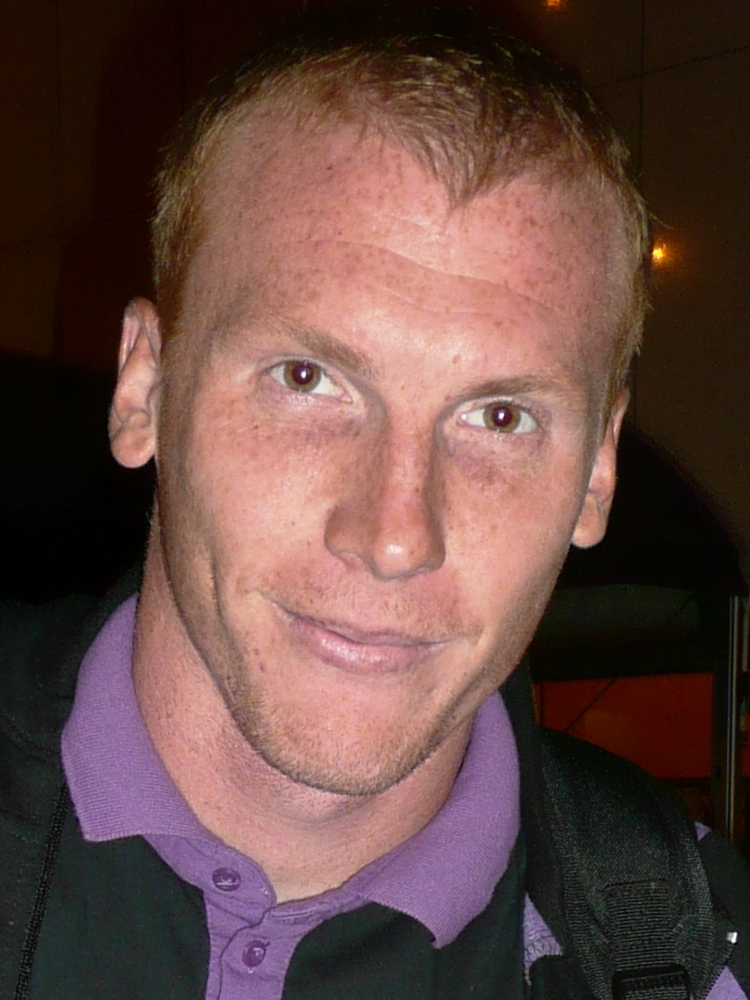
- Mathieu in 2008

Personal information
- Full name: Jérémy Mathieu
- Date of birth: 29 October 1983 (age 43)
- Place of birth: Luxeuil-les-Bains, France
- Height: 1.89 m (6 ft 2 in)
- Positions: Centre-back; left-back

Youth career
- 1988–1992: US Saint-Sauveur
- 1992–1996: JS Froideconche
- 1996–2002: Sochaux

Senior career*
Years	Team	Apps	(Gls)
2002–2005	Sochaux	86	(9)
2005–2009	Toulouse	86	(5)
2009–2014	Valencia	126	(6)
2014–2017	Barcelona	62	(4)
2017–2020	Sporting CP	71	(6)
Total		431	(29)

International career
2000–2001	France U18	7	(0)
2001–2002	France U19	3	(1)
2002–2006	France U21	6	(2)
2011–2016	France	5	(0)
- * Club domestic league appearances and goals

Jérémy Mathieu (born 29 October 1983) is a French former professional footballer who played as a centre-back or a left-back.

Mathieu made 172 Ligue 1 appearances across seven seasons, split equally between Sochaux and Toulouse. He played five seasons in La Liga with Valencia before joining Barcelona in 2014, where he won the treble in his first season.

An international for France from 2011 to 2016, Mathieu was selected in the UEFA Euro 2016 squad but dropped out with injury.

== Club career ==
=== Sochaux ===
Born in Luxeuil-les-Bains, Haute-Saône, Mathieu started his career with the biggest club in the Franche-Comté region, Sochaux. When he was 16, AC Milan were interested in signing him, but Sochaux's coach Jean Fernandez advised him to stay because mentally he still wasn't strong enough.

He made his Ligue 1 debut, during the 2002–03 season, in a league match against Sedan coming on as a late-match substitute. Despite being 18, he was inserted into the starting 11, and quickly provided an impact scoring his first professional goal in just his third league match in a 2–2 draw against Rennes. He made 23 league appearances that season scoring four goals, which included an equalising goal against Paris Saint-Germain, and two game-winning goals against Nantes and Le Havre. His play, along with the team itself, was a main factor in the club finishing 5th and qualifying for the UEFA Cup.

Over the next two seasons, Mathieu continued his great form appearing in 63 league matches and scoring six league goals. He also performed well in Europe appearing in 14 matches and scoring two goals. He also helped Sochaux win the Coupe de la Ligue in 2004. His performances at Sochaux led to strong interest from Italian club Juventus, English clubs Newcastle United, Everton, and Southampton.

=== Toulouse ===
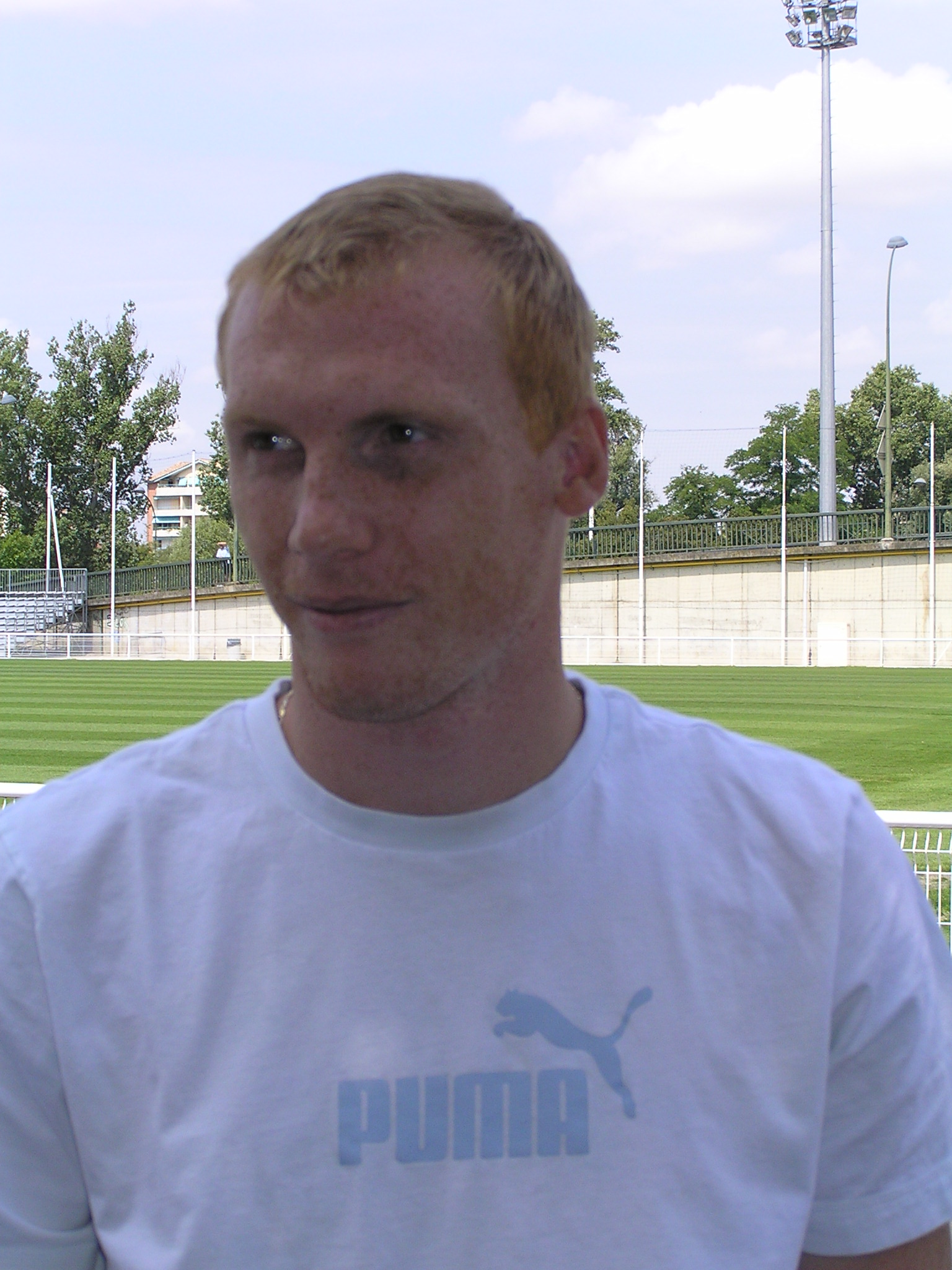
Mathieu with Toulouse in 2007

After announcing his desire to move to another club and only having one year left on his current deal, Sochaux agreed to listen to offers for the player. Eventually, he agreed to join Toulouse after agreeing to a four-year deal. He made his league debut for Toulouse against his former club Sochaux playing the full 90 minutes in a 1–0 victory. He continued this positive play appearing in 36 league matches and scoring two goals against Ajaccio and Troyes. The following season, he made 32 league appearances and score another two goals helping Toulouse qualify for the UEFA Champions League. However, both Mathieu and Toulouse had a horrible 2007–08 season with Mathieu fracturing a bone in his foot, which forced him to miss half the season, and Toulouse finishing just one spot short of relegation. This led to Mathieu pondering his future with the Midi-Pyrénées-based side.

Despite heavy interest from Italian side Roma and other Italian outfits, Toulouse refused to budge with efforts to get Mathieu to remain at the club. Mathieu responded by turning down a contract extension, which effectively allowed him to leave on a free transfer at the end of the 2008–09 season. Eventually it was agreed by Toulouse and Mathieu that the player would see out the season at Toulouse, after Toulouse turned down a €4.5 million move to Bordeaux.

Despite the ongoing transfer situation, Mathieu remained civil in regards to playing. He made 31 league appearances during the 2008–09 season, contributing to Toulouse's successful league campaign, as well as the team's success in the Coupe de France, where they were eliminated in the semi-finals by the eventual champions Guingamp.

=== Valencia ===
On 10 June 2009, Mathieu signed for La Liga club Valencia on a three-year contract. The transfer came into effect on 1 July 2009. He made his debut for the club in a 2–0 win over Sevilla FC.

On 1 May 2014, Mathieu looked to have scored the goal to send Valencia through to the 2014 UEFA Europa League Final when he scored off of Ricardo Costa's lay-off, making the score 3−0 against Sevilla (3−2 on aggregate) but Stéphane Mbia scored a 94th-minute header to win the semi-final on away goals for the Andalusian side. Three days later, Mathieu headed in a corner to send Valencia into a 1−0 lead at the Santiago Bernabéu but Real Madrid battled back to secure a 2−2 draw as Valencia conceded another late stoppage time goal.

=== Barcelona ===
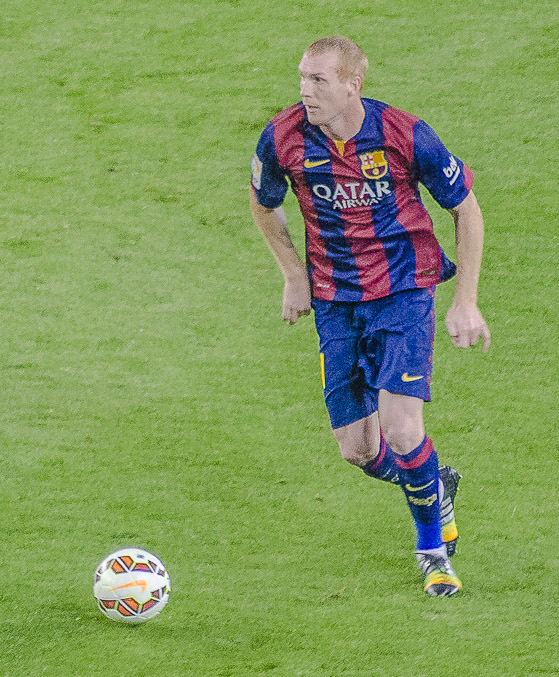
Mathieu playing for Barcelona in 2014

On 23 July 2014, Mathieu signed a contract with La Liga club Barcelona for the next four seasons, with an optional season. The cost of the transfer was €20 million and the buyout clause was set at €50 million. Mathieu claims that he would rather have stayed as Valencia's captain rather than risking "polishing the bench" in Barcelona but that he decided to move after Valencia's chairman Amadeo Salvo rejected his demand for an intermediate figure between his pay in Valencia and Barcelona's proposal.

On 15 January 2015, he scored his first goal for Barcelona in a 4–0 Copa del Rey away win against Elche (9–0 on aggregate) from a free kick. Mathieu scored his first La Liga goal for the club against rivals Real Madrid in a 2–1 El Clásico win at the Camp Nou on 22 March 2015. In the team's next fixture, Mathieu scored the only goal in a 1–0 win at Celta Vigo, to keep his team four points clear at the top of the league. These two winning goals were important for the attainment of Barcelona's 23rd League title, as the team won it by a 2-point advantage over Real Madrid.

In the 2015 UEFA Super Cup against Sevilla in Tbilisi, he conceded a penalty with a foul on Vitolo, which was converted by Kevin Gameiro as the opponents came from 1–4 down to take the game into extra time; Barcelona nonetheless triumphed 5–4.

=== Sporting CP ===
On 7 July 2017, Portuguese club Sporting CP announced the signing of Mathieu on a free transfer for two seasons. He scored his first goal for the club on his sixth appearance, in a 2–0 home win against Tondela. Upon his return to the Camp Nou, Mathieu netted an own goal for Sporting in a 2–0 loss in their final game of the 2017–18 UEFA Champions League group stage.

On 24 June 2020, Mathieu suffered an injury to his left knee during training, which ultimately put an end to his career.

== International career ==
Mathieu has received caps with all of France's youth teams beginning with the under-15s. Though, he was a regular with the under-21 squad leading up to the 2006 UEFA European Under-21 Championship, he was not selected to participate in the event. He received his first call-up to the senior squad for their friendly against Slovakia. However, he played with the second team, France B, who were playing Slovakia B.

He made his national team debut in a friendly against the United States at the Stade de France on 11 November 2011, playing the full 90 minutes.

Mathieu was named in France's squad for their hosting of UEFA Euro 2016, but dropped out with injury on 28 May, to be replaced by Samuel Umtiti.

== Career statistics ==
=== Club ===
Appearances and goals by club, season and competition
Club	Season	League			Cup (Note: Includes Coupe de France, Coupe de la Ligue, Copa del Rey, Taça de Portugal, Taça da Liga)		Europe		Other		Total	
Club	Season	Division	Apps	Goals	Apps	Goals	Apps	Goals	Apps	Goals	Apps	Goals
Sochaux	2002–03	Ligue 1	23	4	3	0	0	0	—		26	4
Sochaux	2003–04	Ligue 1	29	3	3	2	6 (Note: Appearances in UEFA Cup)	1	—		38	6
Sochaux	2004–05	Ligue 1	34	2	2	1	8	1	—		44	4
Sochaux	Total		86	9	8	3	14	2	0	0	108	14
Toulouse	2005–06	Ligue 1	36	2	2	0	—		—		38	2
Toulouse	2006–07	Ligue 1	5	2	2	0	—		—		7	2
Toulouse	2007–08	Ligue 1	14	1	0	0	2 (Note: Appearance(s) in UEFA Champions League)	0	—		16	1
Toulouse	2008–09	Ligue 1	31	0	4	0	—		—		35	0
Toulouse	Total		86	5	8	0	2	0	0	0	96	5
Valencia	2009–10	La Liga	17	1	1	0	6 (Note: Appearances in UEFA Europa League)	0	—		24	1
Valencia	2010–11	La Liga	29	1	2	0	7	0	—		38	1
Valencia	2011–12	La Liga	31	0	6	0	13 (Note: Six appearances in UEFA Champions League, seven in UEFA Europa League)	0	—		50	0
Valencia	2012–13	La Liga	17	1	6	0	1	0	—		24	1
Valencia	2013–14	La Liga	32	3	4	0	10	1	—		46	4
Valencia	Total		126	6	19	0	37	1	0	0	182	7
Barcelona	2014–15	La Liga	28	2	6	1	7	0	—		41	3
Barcelona	2015–16	La Liga	21	0	7	0	3	0	3 (Note: One appearance in UEFA Super Cup, one in Supercopa de España, one in FIFA Club World Cup)	0	34	0
Barcelona	2016–17	La Liga	13	1	0	0	2	0	1 (Note: Appearance in Supercopa de España)	0	16	1
Barcelona	Total		62	3	13	1	12	0	4	0	91	4
Sporting CP	2017–18	Primeira Liga	29	2	7	1	12 (Note: Seven appearances in UEFA Champions League, five in UEFA Europa League)	0	—		48	3
Sporting CP	2018–19	Primeira Liga	24	3	7	0	2	0	—		33	3
Sporting CP	2019–20	Primeira Liga	18	1	2	1	3	1	1 (Note: Appearance in Supertaça Cândido de Oliveira)	0	24	3
Sporting CP	Total		71	6	16	2	17	1	1	0	105	9
Career total			431	29	64	6	82	4	5	0	582	39

=== International ===
Appearances and goals by national team and year
National team	Year	Apps	Goals
France	2011	1	0
France	2012	0	0
France	2013	1	0
France	2014	2	0
France	2015	0	0
France	2016	1	0
Total		5	0

== Honours ==
Sochaux

- Coupe de la Ligue: 2003–04

Barcelona

- La Liga: 2014–15, 2015–16
- Copa del Rey: 2014–15, 2015–16
- Supercopa de España: 2016
- UEFA Champions League: 2014–15
- UEFA Super Cup: 2015
- FIFA Club World Cup: 2015

Sporting CP

- Taça de Portugal: 2018–19
- Taça da Liga: 2017–18, 2018–19

Individual

- Primeira Liga Team of the Year: 2018–19
