= Aimé Lavie =

French footballer (born 1984)

Personal information
- Full name: Aimé Joseph Lavie Mienandy
- Date of birth: 7 December 1984 (age 41)
- Place of birth: Montpellier, France
- Height: 1.85 m (6 ft 1 in)
- Position: Centre-back

Youth career
- –2003: Sochaux

Senior career*
Years	Team	Apps	(Gls)
2003–2005	Sochaux	4	(0)
2005–2006	Sète	15	(0)
2006–2007	Cannes		
2007	Nantes II		
2007–2008	Maccabi Petah Tikva		
2008	F.C. Ryūkyū	12	(0)
2009	Hapoel Kfar Saba	13	(1)
2009–2012	Hakoah Ramat Gan	45	(0)
- * Club domestic league appearances and goals

Aimé Joseph Lavie Mienandy (born 7 December 1984) is a French former professional footballer who played as a centre-back.

== Career ==
Born in Montpellier, Lavie began playing football with the youth side of FC Sochaux-Montbéliard. He played four matches in Ligue 1 for Sochaux between 2003 and 2005. He played 15 matches in Ligue 2 for Sète in the 2005–06 season.

He played for F.C. Ryūkyū in the Japan Football League in 2008. In July 2009, he moved to Hakoah Ramat Gan.

== Personal life ==
Aimé's younger brother, Ted, has also played football professionally.
