= Zé Doca =

Coordinates: 3.24278°S 45.8239°W

- Municipality
- Flag Coat of arms
- Interactive map of Zé Doca
- Country: Brazil
- Region: Nordeste
- State: Maranhão
- Mesoregion: Oeste Maranhense

Population (2020)
  - Total: 51,956
- Time zone: UTC−3 (BRT)

Zé Doca is a municipality in the state of Maranhão in the Northeast region of Brazil.

== Climate ==
Climate data for Zé Doca (1991–2020)
Month	Jan	Feb	Mar	Apr	May	Jun	Jul	Aug	Sep	Oct	Nov	Dec	Year
Mean daily maximum °C (°F)	32.3 (90.1)	31.8 (89.2)	31.6 (88.9)	31.9 (89.4)	32.2 (90.0)	32.2 (90.0)	32.5 (90.5)	33.7 (92.7)	34.7 (94.5)	35.0 (95.0)	34.7 (94.5)	33.9 (93.0)	33.0 (91.4)
Daily mean °C (°F)	26.8 (80.2)	26.4 (79.5)	26.5 (79.7)	26.7 (80.1)	27.1 (80.8)	27.1 (80.8)	27.0 (80.6)	27.5 (81.5)	28.0 (82.4)	28.3 (82.9)	28.4 (83.1)	27.9 (82.2)	27.3 (81.1)
Mean daily minimum °C (°F)	23.3 (73.9)	23.2 (73.8)	23.4 (74.1)	23.5 (74.3)	23.6 (74.5)	23.0 (73.4)	22.5 (72.5)	22.6 (72.7)	22.9 (73.2)	23.2 (73.8)	23.6 (74.5)	23.7 (74.7)	23.2 (73.8)
Average precipitation mm (inches)	255.2 (10.05)	321.8 (12.67)	348.5 (13.72)	342.2 (13.47)	202.6 (7.98)	85.6 (3.37)	40.4 (1.59)	16.2 (0.64)	16.9 (0.67)	23.1 (0.91)	51.4 (2.02)	106.4 (4.19)	1,810.3 (71.27)
Average precipitation days (≥ 1.0 mm)	16.4	19.3	22.3	20.2	15.6	8.0	5.1	2.1	1.7	2.0	4.4	8.3	125.4
Average relative humidity (%)	80.2	83.7	85.1	84.5	81.6	78.0	75.3	70.8	67.2	65.7	67.1	71.5	75.9
Average dew point °C (°F)	23.6 (74.5)	23.8 (74.8)	24.1 (75.4)	24.2 (75.6)	24.2 (75.6)	23.6 (74.5)	23.1 (73.6)	22.7 (72.9)	22.4 (72.3)	22.3 (72.1)	22.6 (72.7)	23.0 (73.4)	23.3 (73.9)
Mean monthly sunshine hours	163.8	144.9	149.1	167.4	205.9	241.3	253.2	267.1	245.8	230.9	196.0	188.0	2,453.4
Source: NOAA

== See also ==
- List of municipalities in Maranhão
