= Grégory Paisley =

French footballer (born 1977)

Personal information
- Date of birth: 7 May 1977 (age 49)
- Place of birth: Paris, France
- Height: 1.84 m (6 ft 0 in)
- Position: Defender

Youth career
- Paris Saint-Germain

Senior career*
Years	Team	Apps	(Gls)
1997–2000	Paris Saint-Germain	18	(1)
1997	→ Servette (loan)	11	(2)
2000–2002	Rennes	22	(0)
2002–2003	→ Le Havre (loan)	37	(0)
2003–2005	Sochaux	49	(0)
2005–2006	Metz	8	(0)
2006–2007	Troyes	42	(1)
2007–2009	Strasbourg	65	(0)
2009–2011	Nice	37	(0)
2011–2012	Guingamp	26	(0)
Total		315	(4)
- * Club domestic league appearances and goals

Grégory Paisley (born 7 May 1977) is a French former professional footballer who played as a defender.

After his retirement in 2012, he started to work as a journalist for beIN Sport. While at Sochaux he played as they won the 2004 Coupe de la Ligue Final.
