= Gérard Gnanhouan =

Ivorian footballer (born 1979)

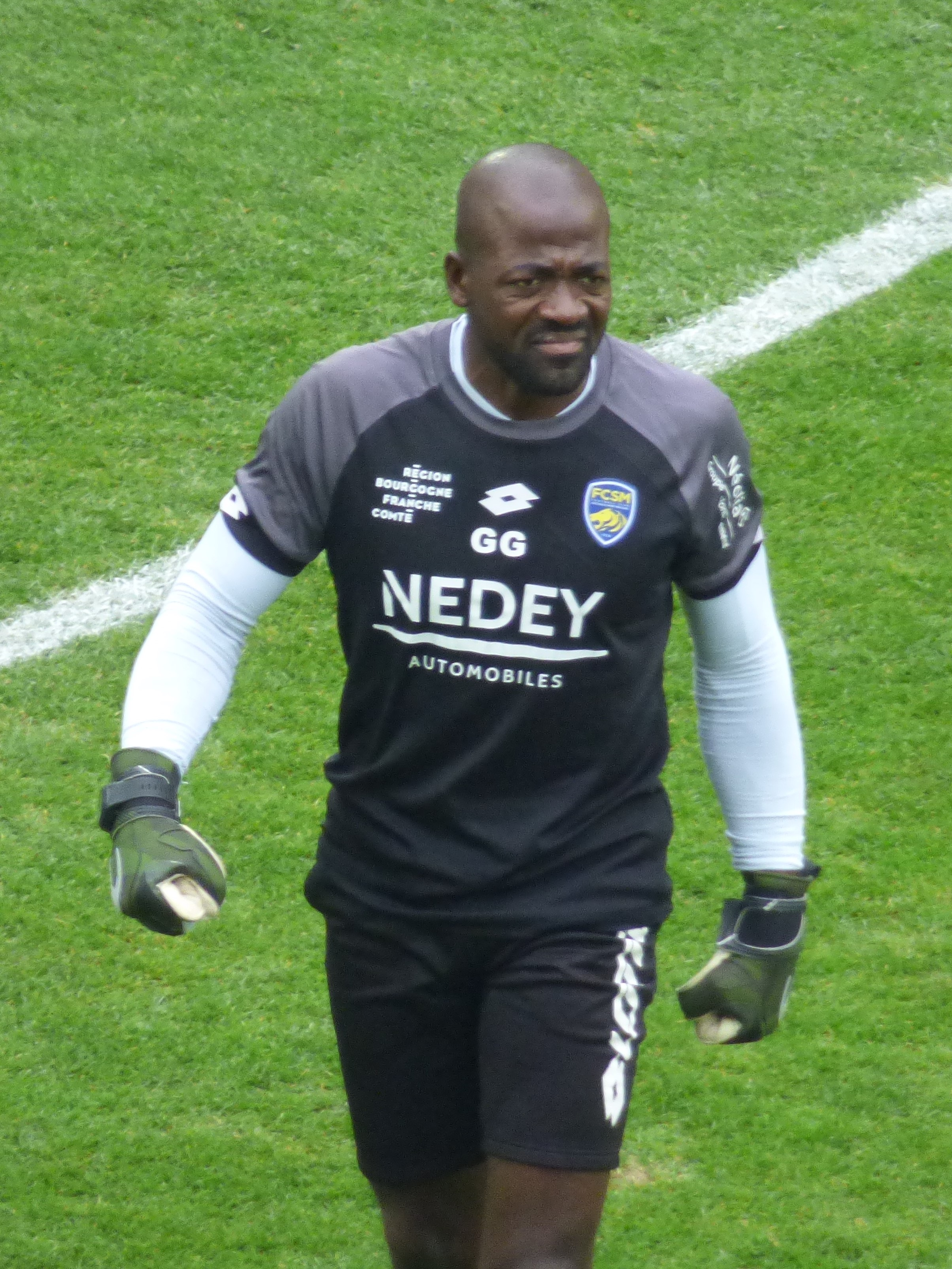
- Gnanhouan with Sochaux in 2019

Personal information
- Full name: Gérard Amoukou Okosias Gnanhouan
- Date of birth: 12 February 1979 (age 47)
- Place of birth: Adzopé, Ivory Coast
- Height: 1.91 m (6 ft 3 in)
- Position: Goalkeeper

Team information
- Current team: Sochaux (goalkeeping coach)

Youth career
- INF Clairefontaine

Senior career*
Years	Team	Apps	(Gls)
1998–2003	Guingamp	13	(0)
2002–2005	Sochaux	22	(0)
2005–2008	Montpellier	4	(0)
2006–2007	→ Créteil (loan)	0	(0)
2008–2009	Fréjus	21	(0)
2009–2011	Vannes	17	(0)
2011–2013	US Avranches	37	(0)
2014–2016	Sochaux B	4	(0)
Total		118	(0)

International career
1997	France U18		
2003–2012	Ivory Coast	10	(0)
- * Club domestic league appearances and goals

Gérard Amoukou Okosias Gnanhouan (born 12 February 1979) is an Ivorian former professional footballer and football coach who played as a goalkeeper. He played for several French clubs, including Guingamp, Sochaux, and Montpellier, and represented the Ivory Coast national team at the 2006 FIFA World Cup. After retiring as a player, he became a goalkeeping coach and serves as Sochaux's goalkeeping coach.

== Club career ==
After training at the INF Clairefontaine national football centre in France, Gnanhouan joined Guingamp in 1997. He developed in the club's youth and reserve teams before making his professional debut in a Coupe de France match during the 1999–2000 season. In the 2001–02 season, he made 13 appearances in Ligue 1, establishing himself as a first-team goalkeeper.

In 2002, he moved to Sochaux. During his time at the club, he appeared in league and cup competitions as well as European tournaments. He contributed to Sochaux's victory in the Coupe de la Ligue in the 2003–04 season. Although Teddy Richert was the first-choice goalkeeper at the time, Gnanhouan also received playing opportunities in several competitions. He played for Sochaux from the 2002–03 season through the 2004–05 season, making 22 league appearances during that period.

In 2005, he joined Montpellier, who were competing in Ligue 2 at the time. He made four league appearances during the 2005–06 season. However, he was unable to secure the first-choice goalkeeper position, and his opportunities became limited. In September 2006, he was loaned to Créteil in search of more playing time, but did not appear in any official league matches. He subsequently returned to Montpellier but failed to establish himself as the first-choice goalkeeper through the 2007–08 season.

In 2008, he joined Fréjus. He spent a season in the CFA, then the fourth tier of French football, before joining Vannes in 2009. At Vannes, he returned to Ligue 2 and made 17 league appearances across the 2009–10 and 2010–11 seasons. He also featured in cup competitions and spent two seasons with the club.

In 2011, he joined CFA club Avranches. He served as the first-choice goalkeeper for two seasons, making 18 league appearances in 2011–12 and 19 in 2012–13. According to a retrospective published by Sochaux, he made a total of 40 appearances for Avranches during his time there. He subsequently ended his playing career.

After retiring, Gnanhouan returned to Sochaux to work as a goalkeeper coach with the youth teams. He also briefly returned to playing with the club's reserve team. This allowed him to serve Sochaux in both playing and coaching capacities.

== International career ==
In 1997, Gnanhouan represented the France under-18 team at the UEFA European Under-18 Championship. He subsequently opted to represent the Ivory Coast national team, making appearances at senior international level from 2003.

On 11 February 2003, he appeared for Ivory Coast in a friendly match against Cameroon, which Ivory Coast won 3–0. He also played in a friendly against Morocco later that year. On 31 March 2004, he guarded the goal in a friendly against Tunisia, helping Ivory Coast secure a 2–0 victory.

On 4 September 2005, Gnanhouan played in a 2006 FIFA World Cup qualifying match against Cameroon, which Ivory Coast lost 3–2. In November of that year, he also appeared in a friendly against Romania. Although his opportunities to play for the national team were subsequently limited, he was included as a goalkeeper in Ivory Coast's squad for the 2006 FIFA World Cup in Germany.

At the 2006 FIFA World Cup, Ivory Coast faced Argentina, the Netherlands, and Serbia and Montenegro in the group stage. Gnanhouan was named among the substitutes for all three matches but did not make an appearance. Ivory Coast lost to Argentina and the Netherlands before defeating Serbia and Montenegro 3–2, finishing third in the group and failing to advance to the knockout stage.

Gnanhouan was also included in Ivory Coast's squad for the 2012 Africa Cup of Nations. Ivory Coast won every match from the group stage through the semi-finals to reach the final, where they drew 0–0 with the Zambia national team before losing in the penalty shoot-out and finishing as runners-up. Gnanhouan was named in the squad for the tournament but did not appear in any matches.

== Honours ==
Sochaux

- Coupe de la Ligue: 2004

Ivory Coast

- Africa Cup of Nations runner-up:2006
