= Philippe Raschke =

French footballer (born 1967)

Personal information
- Date of birth: 19 September 1967 (age 59)
- Place of birth: Clermont-Ferrand, France
- Height: 1.73 m (5 ft 8 in)
- Position: Defender

Youth career
- Monaco

Senior career*
Years	Team	Apps	(Gls)
1988–1991	Monaco	7	(0)
1991–1992	Bordeaux	5	(0)
1992–1995	Cannes	89	(0)
1995–1998	Strasbourg	100	(2)
1998–2004	Sochaux	156	(1)
Total		357	(3)
- * Club domestic league appearances and goals

Philippe Raschke (born 19 September 1967) is a French former professional football defender. While at Strasbourg he won the 1995 UEFA Intertoto Cup and the Coupe de la Ligue in 1997. While at Sochaux he played as they won the 2004 Coupe de la Ligue Final.
