= Fabien Boudarène =

French footballer (born 1978)

Personal information
- Full name: Fabien Boudarène
- Date of birth: 5 October 1978 (age 48)
- Place of birth: Saint-Étienne, France
- Height: 1.77 m (5 ft 10 in)
- Position: Defensive midfielder

Senior career*
Years	Team	Apps	(Gls)
1996–2001	Saint-Etienne	85	(3)
2001–2006	Sochaux	110	(3)
2006–2007	Dijon	21	(0)
2007–2008	Litex Lovech	11	(1)
2008	→ Universitatea Cluj (loan)	8	(0)
2008–2010	Vannes	26	(0)
2010–2011	Aurillac FCA	9	(1)
2011–2012	GSI Pontivy	21	(1)
2012–2013	US Feurs	19	(2)
Total		310	(11)
- * Club domestic league appearances and goals

Fabien Boudarène (born 5 October 1978) is a French former professional footballer who played as a defensive midfielder.

Born in Saint-Étienne, Boudarène began his career with the local AS Saint-Étienne in Ligue 2, helping the team to a promotion to Ligue 1 in 1999. In 2001, he moved to FC Sochaux-Montbéliard and played for the club until 2006, when he was transferred to Ligue 2 side Dijon FCO. In June 2007, Boudarène was acquired by the Bulgarian club PFC Litex Lovech.
