= Michaël Isabey =

French footballer and coach (born 1975)

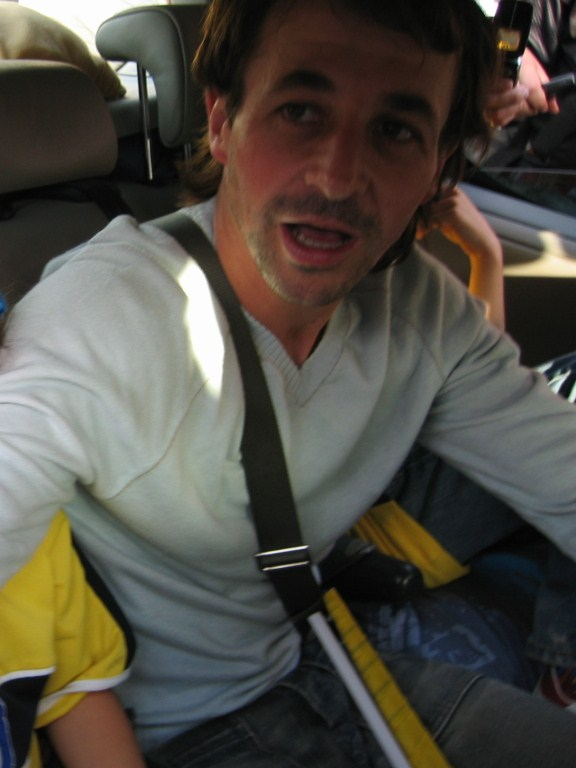

Personal information
- Date of birth: 20 February 1975 (age 51)
- Place of birth: Pontarlier, France
- Height: 1.69 m (5 ft 7 in)
- Position: Midfielder

Team information
- Current team: Dijon (U19 manager)

Senior career*
Years	Team	Apps	(Gls)
1993–1997	Racing Besançon	108	(18)
1997–2009	Sochaux	306	(22)
1999–2000	→ Racing Besançon (loan)	31	(9)
2009–2011	Dijon	50	(3)
2012–2013	Racing Besançon		

Managerial career
- 2014–2017: Racing Besançon
- 2019–: Dijon (U19
- * Club domestic league appearances and goals

Michaël Isabey (born 20 February 1975) is a French football coach and former player who played as a midfielder. He is currently the manager of Dijon FCO's U19 squad. While at Sochaux he played as a substitute as they won the 2004 Coupe de la Ligue Final.

== Coaching career ==
Isabey was appointed manager of Racing Besançon in June 2014. He left the position in March 2017.

On 20 June 2019, Dijon FCO announced, that they had hired Isabey as manager for the U19 squad.
