= Pierre-Alain Frau =

French footballer (born 1980)

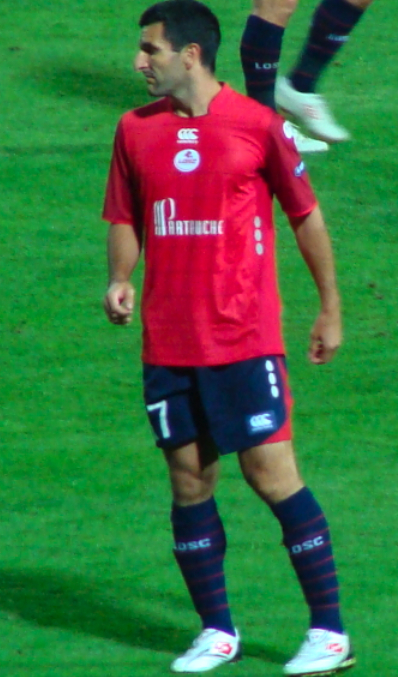
- Frau in 2009

Personal information
- Date of birth: 15 April 1980 (age 46)
- Place of birth: Montbéliard, France
- Height: 1.75 m (5 ft 9 in)
- Positions: Striker; winger

Senior career*
Years	Team	Apps	(Gls)
1997–2004	Sochaux	207	(75)
2004–2006	Lyon	51	(9)
2005–2006	→ Lens (loan)	24	(6)
2006–2008	Paris Saint-Germain	49	(7)
2008–2011	Lille	119	(29)
2011–2012	Caen	32	(6)
2012–2013	Al-Wakrah	20	(5)
2013–2014	Sochaux	7	(0)
Total		509	(137)

International career
2001–2002	France U21	8	(3)

Managerial career
- 2023: Sochaux
Medal record
Men's football
Representing France
UEFA European Under-21 Championship
Runner-up	2002 Switzerland
- * Club domestic league appearances and goals

Pierre-Alain Frau (born 15 April 1980) is a French former professional footballer. He played as a striker or winger for Sochaux (two spells), Lyon, Lens, Paris Saint-Germain, Lille, and Caen in France and for Al-Wakrah.

== Career ==
Nicknamed PAF after his initials, Frau was born on 15 April 1980 in Montbéliard, France, where he became a young find of his hometown club FC Sochaux-Montbéliard, and it was there he got his first opportunity to play in the France national league.

After completing what would have been a prospective move to Lyon from Montbéliard, he found his playing time in the 2004–05 season hampered by the presence of other established frontmen like Sylvain Wiltord, Nilmar and later, John Carew. Realising that it was a World Cup year with a slim chance to catch the attention of national coach Raymond Domenech, Frau secured a half-season loan to RC Lens, but failed to make the cut to the final France squad. Frau was called up to the senior France squad by Raymond Domenech in August 2004 but did not make it off the bench. For the following season, RC Lens wanted to keep him in Lens, but Frau preferred a move to Paris Saint-Germain. The transfer fee was not disclosed, but Olympique Lyonnais priced the striker at £4 million.

On 1 January 2008, Frau signed a three-and-a-half-year deal with Lille and was given the shirt number 17.

Frau is known as one of the more famous players at his hometown club FC Sochaux-Montbéliard.

== Honors ==
Sochaux

- Coupe de la Ligue: 2003–04
- Ligue 2: 2000–01

Lyon

- Ligue 1: 2004–05
- Trophée des Champions: 2004, 2005

Lille

- Ligue 1: 2010–11
- Coupe de France: 2010–11
