= Francileudo Santos =

Brazilian footballer (born 1979)

Personal information
- Full name: Francileudo Silva dos Santos Lima
- Date of birth: 20 March 1979 (age 47)
- Place of birth: Zé Doca, Maranhão, Brazil
- Height: 1.72 m (5 ft 8 in)
- Position: Forward

Youth career
- Sampaio Corrêa

Senior career*
Years	Team	Apps	(Gls)
1996–1998	Standard Liège	10	(0)
1998–2000	Étoile du Sahel	60	(41)
2000–2005	Sochaux	144	(53)
2005–2008	Toulouse	34	(7)
2007	→ Zürich (loan)	12	(4)
2008–2009	Sochaux	16	(2)
2009–2010	Istres	16	(3)
2010–2013	Étoile du Sahel	31	(9)
2013–2015	ASM Belfort	48	(3)
2015–2016	FC Porrentruy	6	(2)
Total		377	(124)

International career
2004–2008	Tunisia	41	(22)
Medal record
Men's football
Representing Tunisia
Africa Cup of Nations
Winner	2004 Tunisia
- * Club domestic league appearances and goals

Francileudo Silva dos Santos Lima (Arabic: فرانسيلودو سيلفا دوس سانتوس ليما; better known as Francileudo Santos or Santos; born 20 March 1979), is a retired professional footballer who played as a forward. Born in Brazil, he represented Tunisia before their hosting of the 2004 Africa Cup of Nations, and was joint top scorer as they won it. He also played at two more such tournaments, and the 2006 FIFA World Cup.

== Club career ==
Born in Zé Doca, Maranhão, Brazil, Santos began his professional career with Standard Liège in Belgium, before spending two years with Étoile Sportive du Sahel in Tunisia. He then moved to FC Sochaux-Montbéliard in France in 2000, and was top scorer with 21 goals and player of the season as they won Ligue 2 in his first season. He played, as they won the 2004 Coupe de la Ligue Final; in the last 32 he scored in a 3–2 extra-time home win over ASOA Valence. In February 2004, he was removed from the squad to avoid a doping ban due to his corticoid use, as the club awaited a facsimile of his prescription from Tunisia.

After nine goals in his final Ligue 1 season, Santos turned down a new two-year contract to sign for fellow league team Toulouse FC on a three-year deal in May 2005. Having played only four times under manager Élie Baup in his second season, he was loaned to FC Zürich of the Swiss Super League in February 2007 for the rest of the season. In May, he opened a 2–0 win against city rivals Grasshopper Club Zürich to take the title.

On 1 July 2008, Santos returned to Sochaux on a one-year deal. He then had a season at FC Istres before going back to Étoile Sportive.

Santos returned to Franche-Comté in September 2013, to sign for ASM Belfort of the fourth-tier CFA. In June 2015, he signed for a year at Swiss amateurs FC Porrentruy.

== International career ==
Santos was naturalised as a Tunisian citizen in 2003, before the country was due to host the 2004 Africa Cup of Nations. He debuted for the Carthage Eagles on 17 January in a 2–1 friendly win over Benin in Sfax, in which he scored after eight minutes. In the first two group games, he scored a goal in a 2–1 win against Rwanda and two in a 3–0 victory against DR Congo. He opened the scoring after five minutes in the final, a 2–1 win over rivals Morocco at the Stade Olympique Hammadi Agrebi. With four goals, he was one of five joint top scorers.

In June 2004, Santos apologised for having draped himself in the Brazilian flag when celebrating Sochaux's Coupe de la Ligue win. He was Tunisia's top scorer with five goals in qualification for the 2006 FIFA World Cup; this included four on 26 March 2005 as they beat Malawi 7–0 at home. He was also part of the squad that were eliminated from the group stage at the 2005 FIFA Confederations Cup in Germany, where he scored both goals of a win over Australia in their last game.

At the 2006 Africa Cup of Nations in Egypt, Tunisia reached the quarter-finals. Santos scored a hat-trick in a 4–1 win over Zambia in the first game and another in a 2–0 victory against South Africa in the next. Manager Roger Lemerre called him up for the 2006 FIFA World Cup, where he only played the last ten minutes of a group stage elimination by Ukraine at the Berlin Olympiastadion, as a substitute for Adel Chedli.

Santos also went to the 2008 Africa Cup of Nations in Ghana, another quarter-final finish. He scored twice in a 3–1 win over South Africa in the second group game.

== Career statistics ==
Scores and results list Tunisia's goal tally first, score column indicates score after each santos goal.

No.	Date	Venue	Opponent	Score	Result	Competition
1	17 January 2004		Benin	1–0	2–1	Friendly
2	24 January 2004	Stade 7 Novembre, Radès, Tunisia	Rwanda	2–1	2–1	2004 Africa Cup of Nations
3	28 January 2004	Stade 7 Novembre, Radès, Tunisia	DR Congo	1–0	3–0	2004 Africa Cup of Nations
4	28 January 2004	Stade 7 Novembre, Radès, Tunisia	DR Congo	3–0	3–0	2004 Africa Cup of Nations
5	14 February 2004	Stade 7 Novembre, Radès, Tunisia	Morocco	1–0	2–1	2004 Africa Cup of Nations
6	4 September 2004	Prince Moulay Abdellah Stadium, Rabat, Morocco	Morocco	1–0	1–1	2006 FIFA World Cup qualification
7	26 March 2005	Stade 7 Novembre, Radès, Tunisia	Malawi	2–0	7–0	2006 FIFA World Cup qualification
8	26 March 2005	Stade 7 Novembre, Radès, Tunisia	Malawi	3–0	7–0	2006 FIFA World Cup qualification
9	26 March 2005	Stade 7 Novembre, Radès, Tunisia	Malawi	5–0	7–0	2006 FIFA World Cup qualification
10	26 March 2005	Stade 7 Novembre, Radès, Tunisia	Malawi	6–0	7–0	2006 FIFA World Cup qualification
11	4 June 2005	Botswana National Stadium, Gaborone, Botswana	Botswana	2–1	3–1	2006 FIFA World Cup qualification
12	21 June 2005	Red Bull Arena, Leipzig, Allemagne	Australia	1–0	2–0	2005 FIFA Confederations Cup
13	21 June 2005	Red Bull Arena, Leipzig, Allemagne	Australia	2–0	2–0	2005 FIFA Confederations Cup
14	11 November 2005	Stade Sébastien Charléty, Paris, France	DR Congo	2–1	2–2	Friendly
15	22 January 2006	Haras El Hodoud Stadium, Alexandria, Egypt	Zambia	1–1	4–1	2006 Africa Cup of Nations
16	22 January 2006	Haras El Hodoud Stadium, Alexandria, Egypt	Zambia	3–1	4–1	2006 Africa Cup of Nations
17	22 January 2006	Haras El Hodoud Stadium, Alexandria, Egypt	Zambia	4–1	4–1	2006 Africa Cup of Nations
18	26 January 2006	Haras El Hodoud Stadium, Alexandria, Egypt	South Africa	1–0	2–0	2006 Africa Cup of Nations
19	30 January 2006	Stade 7 Novembre, Radès, Tunisia	Belarus	2–0	3–0	Friendly
20	9 September 2007	Khartoum Stadium, Khartoum, Sudan	Sudan	2–3	2–3	2008 Africa Cup of Nations qualification
21	27 January 2008	Tamale Stadium, Tamale, Ghana	South Africa	1–0	3–1	2008 Africa Cup of Nations
22	27 January 2008	Tamale Stadium, Tamale, Ghana	South Africa	2–0	3–1	2008 Africa Cup of Nations

== Honours ==
Sochaux

- Ligue 2: 2000–01
- Coupe de la Ligue: 2003–04

FC Zürich

- Swiss Super League: 2006–07

Tunisia

- Africa Cup of Nations: 2004

Individual

- Ligue 2 top scorer: 2000–01
- Ligue 2 player of the year: 2000–01
- Africa Cup of Nations top scorer: 2004
