= Johann Lonfat =

Swiss footballer (born 1973)

Personal information
- Date of birth: 11 September 1973 (age 53)
- Place of birth: Martigny, Switzerland
- Height: 1.78 m (5 ft 10 in)
- Position: Midfielder

Senior career*
Years	Team	Apps	(Gls)
1991–1992	Martigny-Sports	6	(0)
1992–1998	Sion	129	(2)
1998–2002	Servette	123	(21)
2002–2007	Sochaux	96	(1)
2005–2007	→ Sochaux B	18	(0)
2007–2009	Servette	10	(0)
2009	Martigny-Sports	0	(0)
Total		382	(24)

International career
1997–2005	Switzerland	24	(1)
- * Club domestic league appearances and goals

Johann Lonfat (born 11 September 1973) is a Swiss former professional footballer. A midfielder, he played in the centre or on the right.

== Career ==
Lonfat was born in Martigny, Switzerland. During his career, Lonfat represented Martigny-Sports (1991–92 and 2009), FC Sion (1992–98), Servette FC (1998–2002 and 2007–09) and Sochaux (2002–2007, playing 96 Ligue 1 matches with one goal). A Swiss international, he received a total of 24 caps.

He was initially named in Switzerland's UEFA Euro 2004 squad but had to withdraw through injury and was replaced by Tranquillo Barnetta.

== Honours ==
Sion

- Swiss championship: 1996–97
- Swiss Cup: 1994–95, 1995–96, 1996–97

Servette

- Swiss championship: 1998–99
- Swiss Cup: 2000–01

Sochaux

- Coupe de la Ligue: 2003–04
