= Wilson Oruma =

Nigerian footballer (born 1976)

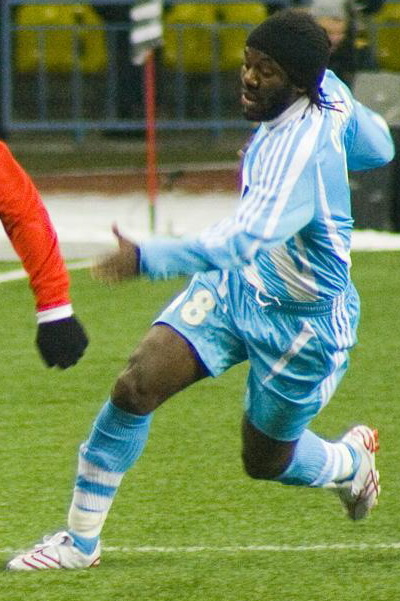
- Oruma with Marseille in 2008

Personal information
- Date of birth: 30 December 1976 (age 49)
- Place of birth: Warri, Nigeria
- Height: 1.74 m (5 ft 9 in)
- Position: Midfielder

Senior career*
| Years | Team | Apps | (Gls) |
| 1993–1994 | Bendel Insurance | | |
| 1994–1998 | Lens | 42 | (2) |
| 1996–1997 | → Nancy (loan) | 22 | (0) |
| 1998–1999 | Samsunspor | 21 | (4) |
| 1999–2000 | Nîmes | 25 | (2) |
| 2000–2002 | Servette | 49 | (12) |
| 2002–2005 | Sochaux | 77 | (6) |
| 2005–2008 | Marseille | 56 | (3) |
| 2008–2009 | Guingamp | 24 | (5) |
| 2009–2010 | Kavala | 23 | (0) |

International career
| 1995–2006 | Nigeria | 19 | (3) |
Medal record
Men's football
| Gold medal – first place | 1996 Atlanta | Team |
- * Club domestic league appearances and goals

Wilson Oruma (born 30 December 1976) is a Nigerian former professional footballer who played as a midfielder. He spent most of his career in France.

== Club career ==
Oruma was born in Warri, Nigeria. He arrived at RC Lens from Bendel Insurance in 1994. A season after being loaned to Nancy, he returned to Lens and played seven matches during their 1997–98 Ligue 1 title campaign. After representing Nigeria at the 1998 FIFA World Cup, he moved to Turkish side Samsunspor, returning to France one year later to play for Nîmes.

In 2000, Oruma was transferred to Swiss side Servette, playing two season before coming back to France again, where he played until 2009 for Sochaux, Marseille and Guingamp, winning the 2003–04 Coupe de la Ligue with Sochaux and the 2008–09 Coupe de France with Guingamp, despite them being a Ligue 2 club at the time. He was handed a trial by Cardiff City - a club based in Wales but who play in the English football league system – in the summer of 2008 and scored in a 2–2 pre-season friendly at Chasetown, but was not awarded a contract due to a lack of fitness.

He retired from professional football in 2010 after a season with Greek club Kavala.

== International career ==
Oruma was part of the Nigeria under-17 team which won the 1993 FIFA U-17 World Championships, captaining his side and becoming the tournament's top goalscorer with 6 goals. He played 19 times international matches over 11 years for Nigeria and was part of the team that participated in the 1998 FIFA World Cup, where he scored in the only appearance he made in the tournament against Paraguay. He also was part of the squad that won the Olympic gold medal in 1996, a year after he debuted for Nigeria, and also a member of the Nigerian squad at the 2002 and 2006 Africa Cup of Nations, finishing both competitions at third place. After a club career in Europe, where he played for the likes of french Ligue 1 sides Lens, Marseille, Sochaux, Guingamp, as well as a stint at Swiss side Servette, winning the UEFA Intertoto Cup, Ligue 1 and French Cup, and earning pay to sustain himself and family after life away from football.

== Personal life ==
In 2018, Oruma suffered emotional disorder as a result of how he was reportedly duped by an unknown pastor. He was broke and in a status of mental disorder six years after he was reportedly defrauded by a clergyman and some fake oil businessmen. It was learnt that Oruma eventually lost a whopping sum, close to N2 billion to an investment.

Oruma holds Nigerian and French nationalities.

== Honours ==
Lens

- Ligue 1: 1997–98

Sochaux

- Coupe de la Ligue: 2004

Marseille

- UEFA Intertoto Cup: 2005

Guingamp

- Coupe de France: 2009

Nigeria

- FIFA U-17 World Cup: 1993
- Olympic Gold Medal: 1996
