= Sylvain Monsoreau =

French footballer (born 1981)

Personal information
- Full name: Sylvain Derome Monsoreau
- Date of birth: 20 March 1981 (age 45)
- Place of birth: Saint-Cyr-l'École, France
- Height: 1.86 m (6 ft 1 in)
- Positions: Centre-back; left-back

Team information
- Current team: Sochaux B (manager)

Youth career
- Sochaux

Senior career*
Years	Team	Apps	(Gls)
1999–2005	Sochaux	121	(4)
2005–2006	Lyon	19	(0)
2006–2008	Monaco	56	(2)
2008–2012	Saint-Étienne	54	(0)
2012–2013	Troyes	36	(0)
2014	Atlético de Kolkata	2	(0)
Total		288	(6)

Managerial career
- 2019–: Sochaux B
- * Club domestic league appearances and goals

Sylvain Derome Monsoreau (born 20 March 1981) is a French football manager and former player who manages Sochaux B. As a player he played as a centre-back and as a left-back. With Sochaux he won the 2003–04 Coupe de la Ligue, scoring Sochaux's goal as they drew 1–1 with Nantes in the final, before winning on penalties.

== Playing career ==
In summer 2005 Monsoreau joined Lyon from Sochaux, having been linked with a move to Bundesliga club Werder Bremen.

== Coaching career ==
In May 2025 he was in his sixth season as manager of the Sochaux reserves.

== Honours ==
Sochaux

- Coupe de la Ligue: 2003–04

Lyon

- Trophée des Champions: 2005
- Ligue 1: 2005–06
