= Teddy Richert =

French footballer (born 1974)

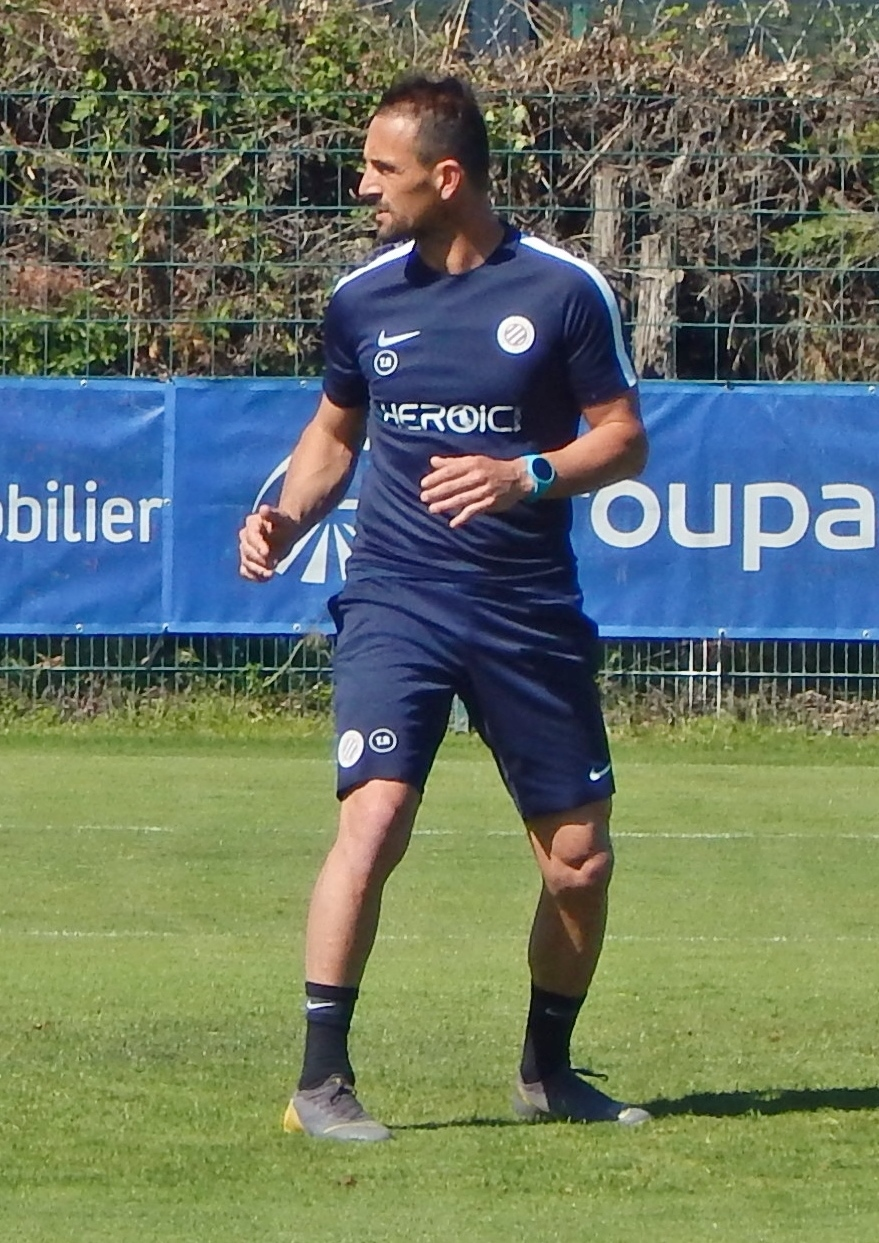
- Richert in 2019

Personal information
- Full name: Teddy Alain Vivian Richert
- Date of birth: 21 September 1974 (age 52)
- Place of birth: Avignon, Vaucluse, France
- Height: 1.82 m (6 ft 0 in)
- Position: Goalkeeper

Team information
- Current team: Montpellier (goalkeeper coach)

Youth career
- Toulouse

Senior career*
Years	Team	Apps	(Gls)
1991–1999	Toulouse	77	(0)
1999–2001	Bordeaux	0	(0)
2000–2001	→ Lille (loan)	1	(0)
2001–2012	Sochaux	323	(0)
Total		401	(0)
- * Club domestic league appearances and goals

Teddy Alain Vivian Richert (born 21 September 1974) is a French former footballer who played goalkeeper. He is a goalkeeper coach for Montpellier.

== Career ==
Richert spent the most of his career at Sochaux-Montbéliard and was considered to be one of the most consistent goalkeepers in Ligue 1, and has performed well over the past decade. Opportunities for international football for Richert were few and far between, due to Domenech's preference of Grégory Coupet and, in the latter part of the decade, Fabien Barthez.

While at Sochaux he helped them win the 2004 Coupe de la Ligue Final and the 2007 Coupe de France Final. Both matches went to a penalty shootout and Richert saved decisive penalties on each occasion; first from Nantes' Pascal Delhommeau in 2004 and then from Marseille's Ronald Zubar in 2007.

== Career statistics ==
Appearances and goals by club, season and competition
Club	Season	League			National cup		League cup		Europe		Other		Total	
Club	Season	Division	Apps	Goals	Apps	Goals	Apps	Goals	Apps	Goals	Apps	Goals	Apps	Goals
Toulouse	1993–94	Division 1	0	0	0	0	—		—		—		0	0
Toulouse	1994–95	Division 2	0	0	0	0	0	0	—		—		0	0
Toulouse	1995–96	Division 2	0	0	0	0	0	0	—		—		0	0
Toulouse	1996–97	Division 2	20	0	1	0	2	0	—		—		23	0
Toulouse	1997–98	Division 1	31	0	1	0	2	0	—		—		34	0
Toulouse	1998–99	Division 1	26	0	0	0	3	0	—		—		29	0
Toulouse	Total		77	0	2	0	7	0	—		—		86	0
Bordeaux	1999–2000	Division 1	0	0	0	0	0	0	1 (Note: Appearance(s) in UEFA Champions League)	0	0	0	1	0
Lille (loan)	2000–01	Division 1	1	0	0	0	0	0	—		—		1	0
Sochaux	2001–02	Division 1	9	0	2	0	1	0	—		—		12	0
Sochaux	2002–03	Ligue 1	34	0	1	0	3	0	5 (Note: Appearance(s) in UEFA Intertoto Cup)	0	—		43	0
Sochaux	2003–04	Ligue 1	21	0	0	0	1	0	2 (Note: Appearance(s) in UEFA Cup)	0	—		24	0
Sochaux	2004–05	Ligue 1	37	0	4	0	0	0	7	0	—		48	0
Sochaux	2005–06	Ligue 1	36	0	3	0	1	0	—		—		40	0
Sochaux	2006–07	Ligue 1	38	0	6	0	3	0	—		—		47	0
Sochaux	2007–08	Ligue 1	38	0	3	0	1	0	2	0	1 (Note: Appearance(s) in Trophée des Champions)	0	45	0
Sochaux	2008–09	Ligue 1	33	0	0	0	2	0	—		—		35	0
Sochaux	2009–10	Ligue 1	31	0	3	0	0	0	—		—		34	0
Sochaux	2010–11	Ligue 1	15	0	0	0	0	0	—		—		15	0
Sochaux	2011–12	Ligue 1	31	0	0	0	0	0	2 (Note: Appearance(s) in UEFA Europa League)	0	—		33	0
Sochaux	Total		323	0	22	0	12	0	18	0	1	0	376	0
Career total			401	0	24	0	19	0	19	0	1	0	464	0

== Honours ==
Sochaux

- Coupe de la Ligue: 2003–04
- Coupe de France: 2006–07

Individual

- Ligue 1 Goalkeeper of the Year: 2006–07
