= 2004–05 Coupe de la Ligue =

French League Cup

Tournament details
- Country: France
- Dates: 5 October 2004 – 30 April 2005
- Teams: 44

Final positions
- Champions: Strasbourg (2nd title)
- Runners-up: Caen

Tournament statistics
- Matches played: 43
- Goals scored: 113 (2.63 per match)
- Top goal scorer: Stéphane Samson (4 goals)

The 2004–05 Coupe de la Ligue, a knockout cup competition in French football organised by the Ligue de Football Professionnel, began on 5 October 2004. The final was held on 30 April 2005 at the Stade de France. RC Strasbourg defeated SM Caen 2–1 in the final.

== First round ==
The matches were contested on 5, 6 and 8 October 2004.

5 October 2004	Clermont	3–1 (a.e.t.)	Rouen	Clermont-Ferrand
	Jezierski 39'; Lotiès 104'; Faye 109'	(Report)	Puig 82'; Koubemba (red card) 13'	Stadium: Stade Gabriel Montpied; Attendance: 2,215; Referee: Jérôme Auroux

5 October 2004	Le Havre	5–0	Valence	Le Havre
	Jäger 30', 42'; Mandanne 32'; Ducrocq 37'; Akrour 88'	(Report)		Stadium: Stade Jules Deschaseaux; Attendance: 3,577; Referee: Jean-Marc Rodolphe

5 October 2004	Montpellier	1–0 (a.e.t.)	Besançon	Montpellier
	Atık 118'	Report		Stadium: Stade de la Mosson; Attendance: 2,566; Referee: Jean-Charles Cailleux

5 October 2004	Wasquehal	0–1	Brest	Villeneuve-d'Ascq
		(Report)	Dissa 47'	Stadium: Stadium Lille Métropole; Attendance: 1,051; Referee: Saïd Ennjimi

6 October 2004	Créteil	1–0	Gueugnon	Créteil
	M'Bodji 27'	(Report)		Stadium: Stade Dominique Duvauchelle; Attendance: 1,448; Referee: Yves Brizou

6 October 2004	Châteauroux	0–1	Laval	Châteauroux
	Bertin (red card) 89'	(Report)	Aït Alia 45'	Stadium: Stade Gaston Petit; Attendance: 4,948; Referee: Alexandre Castro

6 October 2004	Le Mans	0–0 (a.e.t.) (4–3 p)	Grenoble	Le Mans
		(Report)	Kamissoko (red card) 110'	Stadium: Stade Léon-Bollée; Attendance: 5,517; Referee: Mickaël Annonier
	Penalties
	Fanchone (penalty missed); Bonnart (penalty scored); Thomas (penalty scored); Lucau (penalty scored); Hautcœur (penalty scored)		(penalty scored) Danic; (penalty missed) Stinat; (penalty scored) de Freitas; (penalty scored) Hatchi; (penalty missed) Chanelet

6 October 2004	Lorient	1–2	Guingamp	Lorient
	Dahou 27'	(Report)	Fauré 7'; Sikimić 44'	Stadium: Stade du Moustoir; Attendance: 4,682; Referee: Stéphane Djouzi

6 October 2004	Sedan	1–1 (a.e.t.) (3–2 p)	Angers	Sedan
	Mokaké 39'	(Report)	Norbert 68'	Stadium: Stade Louis Dugauguez; Attendance: 6,123; Referee: Gaël Lecellier
	Penalties
	Deschamps (penalty scored); Mokaké (penalty missed); Charpenet (penalty scored); Henin (penalty missed); Noro (penalty scored)		(penalty missed) Bedrossian; (penalty scored) Dussart; (penalty missed) Grimaldi; (penalty missed) Norbert; (penalty scored) Dia

6 October 2004	Troyes	2–2 (a.e.t.) (3–2 p)	Amiens	Troyes
	Bangoura 73'; Nivet 120' (pen.)	(Report)	Colleau 85'; Lebrun 118'	Stadium: Stade de l'Aube; Attendance: 4,210; Referee: Sandryk Biton
	Penalties
	Amzine (penalty scored); Adam (penalty scored); Perrone (penalty scored); Garny (penalty missed)		(penalty scored) Colleau; (penalty scored) Niçoise; (penalty missed) Leroy; (penalty missed) Ewolo; (penalty missed) Lebrun

8 October 2004	Dijon	1–0	Niort	Dijon
	Heitzmann 59'	(Report)		Stadium: Stade Gaston Gérard; Attendance: 2,173; Referee: Serge Fidri

8 October 2004	Nancy	2–2 (a.e.t.) (3–5 p)	Reims	Nancy
	Puygrenier 6'; Fayolle 66'	(Report)	Arnaud 45'; Hebbar 72'	Stadium: Stade Marcel Picot; Attendance: 9,610; Referee: Éric Brocas
	Penalties
	Celdran (penalty scored); Berenguer (penalty missed); Lécluse (penalty scored); Fayolle (penalty scored)		(penalty scored) Arnaud; (penalty scored) Didot; (penalty scored) Leroy; (penalty scored) Stephanopoli; (penalty scored) Barbier

== Second round ==
The matches were contested on 9 and 10 November 2004.

9 November 2004	Le Havre	4–1	Le Mans	Le Havre
	Soumaré 8'; Digard 20'; Mocquet 37'; Roda 52'	(Report)	Lucau 22'	Stadium: Stade Jules Deschaseaux; Attendance: 3,067; Referee: Bruno Coué

9 November 2004	Sedan	0–1	Monaco	Sedan
	Ducourtioux (red card) 90'	(Report)	Chevantón 51'	Stadium: Stade Louis Dugauguez; Attendance: 16,731; Referee: Philippe Kalt

9 November 2004	Montpellier	3–1	Reims	Montpellier
	Lafourcade 47'; Atık 56'; Cissé 78'	(Report)	Diané 38'; Walter (red card) 58'; Barbier (red card) 75'	Stadium: Stade de la Mosson; Attendance: 3,531; Referee: Jean-Marc Bonnin

9 November 2004	Brest	1–2	Sochaux	Brest
	Forest 3'	(Report)	Mathieu 28'; Pitau 87'	Stadium: Stade Francis-Le Blé; Attendance: 8,254; Referee: Patrick Hermite

9 November 2004	Nice	1–1 (a.e.t.) (4–5 p)	Lens	Nice
	Roudet 44'	(Report)	Keita 13'	Stadium: Stade du Ray; Attendance: 4,611; Referee: Alain Sars
	Penalties
	Vahirua (penalty scored); Dié (penalty scored); Grenet (penalty scored); Balmont (penalty scored); Traoré (penalty missed); Abardonado (penalty missed)		(penalty scored) Gillet; (penalty scored) Barul; (penalty scored) Cousin; (penalty scored) Keita; (penalty missed) Thomert; (penalty scored) Malouda

9 November 2004	Dijon	2–1 (a.e.t.)	Bordeaux	Dijon
	Heitzmann 16'; Mangione 120'	(Report)	Cohade 48'	Stadium: Stade Gaston Gérard; Attendance: 6,507; Referee: Dominique Fraise

9 November 2004	Troyes	1–3	Strasbourg	Troyes
	Grax 65'	(Report)	Niang 40', 74'; Farnerud 80'	Stadium: Stade de l'Aube; Attendance: 5,838; Referee: Tony Chapron

9 November 2004	Ajaccio	0–2	Caen	Ajaccio
		(Report)	Jovičić 11'; Deroin 70'	Stadium: Stade François Coty; Attendance: 1,102; Referee: Thierry Auriac

9 November 2004	Clermont	0–0 (a.e.t.) (5–4 p)	Toulouse	Clermont-Ferrand
		(Report)		Stadium: Stade Gabriel Montpied; Attendance: 4,766; Referee: Stéphane Moulin
	Penalties
	Poyet (penalty scored); Tabet (penalty scored); Lotiès (penalty missed); Brando (penalty missed); Perbet (penalty scored); Gallon (penalty scored); Jezierski (penalty scored)		(penalty missed) Dieuze; (penalty scored) Ebondo; (penalty missed) Taïder; (penalty scored) Sirieix; (penalty scored) Bedimo; (penalty scored) Akpa Akpro; (penalty missed) Psaume

9 November 2004	Saint-Étienne	3–1	Créteil	Saint-Étienne
	Piquionne 7', 51'; Carteron 77'	(Report)	Cavalli 72'	Stadium: Stade Geoffroy-Guichard; Attendance: 13,680; Referee: Philippe Malige

9 November 2004	Metz	1–2 (a.e.t.)	Bastia	Metz
	Gueye 113'	(Report)	Jau 94'; Vairelles 105'	Stadium: Stade Saint-Symphorien; Attendance: 9,668; Referee: Damien Ledentu

10 November 2004	Rennes	1–1 (a.e.t.) (3–5 p)	Auxerre	Rennes
	Källström 54'	(Report)	Dudu Cearense 85' (o.g.)	Stadium: Stade de la Route de Lorient; Attendance: 19,553; Referee: Laurent Duhamel
	Penalties
	Källström (penalty scored); Dudu Cearense (penalty scored); Mvuemba (penalty missed); Sorlin (penalty scored)		(penalty scored) Cheyrou; (penalty scored) Benjani; (penalty scored) Vandenbossche; (penalty scored) Akalé; (penalty scored) Lachuer

10 November 2004	Lille	3–2 (a.e.t.)	Lyon	Villeneuve-d'Ascq
	Moussilou 56'; Dernis 110'; Dumont 120'	(Report)	Abidal 89'; Ben Arfa 101' (pen.)	Stadium: Stadium Lille Métropole; Attendance: 15,015; Referee: Bertrand Layec

10 November 2004	Nantes	2–1	Laval	Nantes
	Cetto 58'; Pujol 73'	(Report)	Marco Paulo 41'	Stadium: Stade de la Beaujoire; Attendance: 19,648; Referee: Stéphane Lannoy

10 November 2004	Guingamp	4–2 (a.e.t.)	Istres	Guingamp
	Fauré 5', 118'; Bridonneau 93'; Sikimić 104'	(Report)	Maurice 12' (pen.); Courtois 108'	Stadium: Stade du Roudourou; Attendance: 5,035; Referee: Fredy Fautrel

10 November 2004	Marseille	2–3	Paris Saint-Germain	Marseille
	Pedretti 38'; Bamogo 41' (pen.)	(Report)	Bošković 45', 53'; Mendy 89'	Stadium: Stade Vélodrome; Attendance: 54,281; Referee: Stéphane Bré

== Round of 16 ==
The matches were contested on 21 and 22 December 2004.

21 December 2004	Montpellier	1–0	Paris Saint-Germain	Montpellier
	Mansaré 85' (pen.)	(Report)	Cissé (red card) 68'	Stadium: Stade de la Mosson; Attendance: 16,356; Referee: Pascal Viléo

21 December 2004	Le Havre	0–1	Saint-Étienne	Le Havre
		(Report)	Hellebuyck 58'	Stadium: Stade Jules Deschaseaux; Attendance: 7,913; Referee: Bruno Ruffray

21 December 2004	Monaco	1–0	Guingamp	Monaco
	Adebayor 82'	(Report)	Kouassi (yellow card) 87' (red card) 89'	Stadium: Stade Louis II; Attendance: 8,400; Referee: Thierry Auriac

21 December 2004	Clermont	4–0	Dijon	Clermont-Ferrand
	Poyet 8', 25'; Samson 52', 82'; Gallon (red card) 37'	(Report)	Asuar (red card) 37'	Stadium: Stade Gabriel Montpied; Attendance: 4,854; Referee: Olivier Thual

21 December 2004	Strasbourg	1–1 (a.e.t.) (4–2 p)	Lille	Strasbourg
	Farnerud 71'	(Report)	Makoun 46'; Plestan (red card) 53'	Stadium: Stade de la Meinau; Attendance: 7,678; Referee: Hervé Piccirillo
	Penalties
	Devaux (penalty scored); Kanté (penalty scored); Carlier (penalty scored); Niang (penalty scored)		(penalty missed) Tafforeau; (penalty missed) Dernis; (penalty scored) Landrin; (penalty scored) Cabaye

21 December 2004	Bastia	0–1	Lens	Bastia
		(Report)	Utaka 83'	Stadium: Stade Armand Cesari; Attendance: 1,556; Referee: Gilles Veissière

22 December 2004	Sochaux	0–0 (a.e.t.) (3–4 p)	Caen	Montbéliard
		(Report)		Stadium: Stade Auguste Bonal; Attendance: 16,182; Referee: Bruno Derrien
	Penalties
	Mathieu (penalty scored); Pitau (penalty scored); Tall (penalty missed); Diawara (penalty missed); Boudarène (penalty scored)		(penalty missed) Ben Askar; (penalty scored) Zubar; (penalty scored) Deroin; (penalty scored) Lemaître; (penalty scored) Danjou

22 December 2004	Auxerre	2–1	Nantes	Auxerre
	Pieroni 79'; Benjani 87'	(Report)	Ahamada 20'	Stadium: Stade de l'Abbé-Deschamps; Attendance: 10,472; Referee: Claude Colombo

== Final draw ==
Quarterfinals
H	Auxerre	1 (5)
A	Caen	1 (6)
H	Montpellier	1
A	Monaco	2
H	Strasbourg	3
A	Clermont	2
H	Lens	0
A	Saint-Étienne	3

Semifinals
H	Caen	3
A	Monaco	1
H	Strasbourg	1
A	Saint-Étienne	0

Final
Caen	1
Strasbourg	2

== Final draw results ==
=== Quarter-finals ===
The matches were contested on 18 and 19 January 2005.

18 January 2005	Lens	0–3	Saint-Étienne	Lens
		(Report)	Piquionne 21'; Feindouno 74' (pen.); Marin 88'	Stadium: Stade Félix-Bollaert; Attendance: 24,611; Referee: Bertrand Layec

19 January 2005	Auxerre	1–1 (a.e.t.) (5–6 p)	Caen	Auxerre
	Pieroni 107'	(Report)	Watier 110'	Stadium: Stade de l'Abbé-Deschamps; Attendance: 7,549; Referee: Éric Poulat
	Penalties
	Jaurès (penalty scored); Cheyrou (penalty scored); Kalou (penalty scored); Benjani (penalty scored); Pieroni (penalty scored); Mignot (penalty missed)		(penalty scored) Askar; (penalty scored) Zubar; (penalty scored) Watier; (penalty scored) Hengbart; (penalty scored) Deroin; (penalty scored) Jovičić

19 January 2005	Strasbourg	3–2	Clermont	Strasbourg
	Pagis 24', 28'; Johansen 33'	(Report)	Samson 62', 83'	Stadium: Stade de la Meinau; Attendance: 5,236; Referee: Damien Ledentu

19 January 2005	Montpellier	1–2	Monaco	Montpellier
	Lafourcade 80'	(Report)	Adebayor 59'; Veigneau 78'	Stadium: Stade de la Mosson; Attendance: 19,828; Referee: Stéphane Duhamel

=== Semi-finals ===
The matches were contested on 1 and 2 February 2005.

1 February 2005	Strasbourg	1–0	Saint-Étienne	Strasbourg
	Farnerud 55'	(Report)		Stadium: Stade de la Meinau; Attendance: 11,307; Referee: Pascal Viléo

2 February 2005	Caen	3–1	Monaco	Caen
	Mazure 31'; Lemaître 42'; Watier 52' (pen.)	(Report)	Adebayor 82'; Audard (red card) 64'	Stadium: Stade Michel d'Ornano; Attendance: 18,697; Referee: Philippe Kalt

=== Final ===
The final was held on 30 April 2005 at the Stade de France, Saint-Denis.

30 April 2005
20:45

Caen	1–2	Strasbourg
Mazure 42'		Niang 38'; Devaux 79'

Stade de France, Saint-Denis
Attendance: 78,732
Referee: Gilles Veissière

== Top goalscorers ==
Rank	Name	Team	Goals	Minutes played
1	(France) Stéphane Samson	Clermont	4	333'
2	(Togo) Emmanuel Adebayor	Monaco	3	227'
2	(France) Cédric Fauré	Guingamp	3	228'
2	(France) Frédéric Piquionne	Saint-Étienne	3	242'
2	(Sweden) Alexander Farnerud	Strasbourg	3	383'
2	(Senegal) Mamadou Niang	Strasbourg	3	478'
