= 2004–05 Stade Malherbe Caen season =

Stade Malherbe Caen
2004–05 season
- President: Jean-François Fortin
- Head coach: Patrick Remy; Franck Dumas
- Stadium: Stade Michel d'Ornano
- Ligue 1: 18th (relegated)
- Coupe de France: Round of 32
- Coupe de la Ligue: Runners-up
- Top goalscorer: League: Sébastien Mazure (13); All: Sébastien Mazure (15)
- Average home league attendance: 19,815
Home colours	Away colours

The 2004–05 season was the 91st season in the existence of Stade Malherbe Caen and the club's first season back in the top flight of French football. In addition to the domestic league, Caen participated in this season's edition of the Coupe de France and the Coupe de la Ligue. The season covered the period from 1 July 2004 to 30 June 2005.

== Pre-season and friendlies ==
Win Draw Loss

21 July 2004 Friendly	Caen (France)	1–0	(Netherlands) PSV Eindhoven	France
19:00 CEST (UTC+2)

== Competitions ==
=== Overall record ===
Competition	First match	Last match	Starting round	Final position	Record							
Competition	First match	Last match	Starting round	Final position	Pld	W	D	L	GF	GA	GD	Win %
Ligue 1	7 August 2004	28 May 2005	Matchday 1	18th	38	10	12	16	36	60	−24	26.32
Coupe de France	8 January 2005	12 February 2005	Round of 64	Round of 32	2	1	0	1	2	2	+0	50.00
Coupe de la Ligue	9 November 2004	30 April 2005	Round of 32	Runners-up	5	2	2	1	7	4	+3	40.00
Total					45	13	14	18	45	66	−21	28.89

Source: Competitions

=== Ligue 1 ===
==== League table ====
Pos	Team	Pld	W	D	L	GF	GA	GD	Pts	Qualification or relegation
16	Metz	38	10	14	14	33	45	−12	44	
17	Nantes	38	10	13	15	33	38	−5	43	
18	Caen (R)	38	10	12	16	36	60	−24	42	Relegation to Ligue 2
19	Bastia (R)	38	11	8	19	32	48	−16	41	Relegation to Ligue 2
20	Istres (R)	38	6	14	18	25	51	−26	32	Relegation to Ligue 2

Source: Ligue 1
Rules for classification: 1) points; 2) goal difference; 3) number of goals scored.
(R) Relegated

==== Results summary ====
Overall								Home						Away					
Pld	W	D	L	GF	GA	GD	Pts	W	D	L	GF	GA	GD	W	D	L	GF	GA	GD
38	10	12	16	36	60	−24	42	5	8	6	15	18	−3	5	4	10	21	42	−21

Source: Ligue 1

==== Results by round ====
Round	1	2	3	4	5	6	7	8	9	10	11	12	13	14	15	16	17	18	19	20	21	22	23	24	25	26	27	28	29	30	31	32	33	34	35	36	37	38
Ground	H	A	H	A	H	A	H	A	H	A	H	A	H	A	H	A	H	A	H	H	A	H	A	H	A	H	A	H	A	H	A	H	A	H	A	H	A	A
Result	D	D	W	L	W	L	D	D	D	L	W	D	L	W	D	L	L	L	L	D	L	L	W	D	L	D	D	W	L	D	L	L	W	L	W	W	W	L
Position	9	13	9	11	9	12	12	12	13	14	11	12	14	9	10	14	15	15	16	15	17	18	16	16	17	17	17	17	17	17	18	18	18	19	19	18	17	18

Source: Ligue 1
A = Away; H = Home; W = Win; D = Draw; L = Loss

==== Matches ====
7 August 2004 1	Caen	1–1	Istres	Caen
20:00 CEST (UTC+2)				Stadium: Stade Michel d'Ornano; Attendance: 16,450; Referee: Philippe Malige

14 August 2004 2	Paris Saint-Germain	2–2	Caen	Paris
17:15 CEST (UTC+2)				Stadium: Parc des Princes; Attendance: 32,814; Referee: Olivier Thual

21 August 2004 3	Caen	1–0	Monaco	Caen
20:00 CEST (UTC+2)				Stadium: Stade Michel d'Ornano; Attendance: 20,651; Referee: Pascal Viléo

28 August 2004 4	Auxerre	1–0	Caen	Auxerre
20:00 CEST (UTC+2)				Stadium: Stade de l'Abbé Deschamps; Attendance: 10,176; Referee: Stéphane Moulin

11 September 2004 5	Caen	1–0	Lens	Caen
20:00 CEST (UTC+2)				Stadium: Stade Michel d'Ornano; Attendance: 19,837; Referee: Bertrand Layec

19 September 2004 6	Lille	2–0	Caen	Villeneuve d'Ascq
19:00 CEST (UTC+2)				Stadium: Stadium Lille Métropole; Attendance: 10,428; Referee: Alain Sars

22 September 2004 7	Caen	0–0	Strasbourg	Caen
20:30 CEST (UTC+2)				Stadium: Stade Michel d'Ornano; Attendance: 18,988; Referee: Bruno Derrien

25 September 2004 8	Ajaccio	2–2	Caen	Ajaccio
CEST (UTC+2)				Stadium: Stade François Coty

2 October 2004 9	Caen	1–1	Bordeaux	Caen
CEST (UTC+2)				Stadium: Stade Michel d'Ornano

15 October 2004 10	Lyon	4–0	Caen	Lyon
CEST (UTC+2)				Stadium: Stade de Gerland

23 October 2004 11	Caen	2–1	Nantes	Caen
CEST (UTC+2)				Stadium: Stade Michel d'Ornano

30 October 2004 12	Rennes	1–1	Caen	Rennes
CEST (UTC+2)				Stadium: Stade de la Route de Lorient

6 November 2004 13	Caen	0–2	Sochaux	Caen
CEST (UTC+2)				Stadium: Stade Michel d'Ornano

13 November 2004 14	Metz	1–2	Caen	Metz
CEST (UTC+2)				Stadium: Stade Saint-Symphorien

20 November 2004 15	Caen	0–0	Nice	Caen
CEST (UTC+2)				Stadium: Stade Michel d'Ornano

27 November 2004 16	Bastia	2–0	Caen	Furiani
CEST (UTC+2)				Stadium: Stade Armand Cesari

4 December 2004 17	Caen	2–3	Marseille	Caen
CEST (UTC+2)				Stadium: Stade Michel d'Ornano

11 December 2004 18	Saint-Étienne	5–0	Caen	Saint-Étienne
CEST (UTC+2)				Stadium: Stade Geoffroy-Guichard

18 December 2004 19	Caen	0–2	Toulouse	Caen
CEST (UTC+2)				Stadium: Stade Michel d'Ornano

12 January 2005 20	Caen	0–0	Paris Saint-Germain	Caen
CEST (UTC+2)				Stadium: Stade Michel d'Ornano

15 January 2005 21	Monaco	5–2	Caen	Monaco
CEST (UTC+2)				Stadium: Stade Louis II

22 January 2005 22	Caen	0–2	Auxerre	Caen
CEST (UTC+2)				Stadium: Stade Michel d'Ornano

26 January 2005 23	Lens	0–1	Caen	Lens
CEST (UTC+2)				Stadium: Stade Félix-Bollaert

29 January 2005 24	Caen	0–0	Lille	Caen
CEST (UTC+2)				Stadium: Stade Michel d'Ornano

5 February 2005 25	Strasbourg	5–0	Caen	Strasbourg
CEST (UTC+2)				Stadium: Stade de la Meinau

19 February 2005 26	Caen	2–2	Ajaccio	Caen
CEST (UTC+2)				Stadium: Stade Michel d'Ornano

26 February 2005 27	Bordeaux	2–2	Caen	Bordeaux
CEST (UTC+2)				Stadium: Stade Chaban-Delmas

4 March 2005 28	Caen	1–0	Lyon	Caen
CEST (UTC+2)				Stadium: Stade Michel d'Ornano

12 March 2005 29	Nantes	2–0	Caen	Nantes
CEST (UTC+2)				Stadium: Stade de la Beaujoire

19 March 2005 30	Caen	2–2	Rennes	Caen
CEST (UTC+2)				Stadium: Stade Michel d'Ornano

2 April 2005 31	Sochaux	1–0	Caen	Montbéliard
CEST (UTC+2)				Stadium: Stade Auguste Bonal

9 April 2005 32	Caen	0–1	Metz	Caen
CEST (UTC+2)				Stadium: Stade Michel d'Ornano

16 April 2005 33	Nice	0–1	Caen	Nîmes
CEST (UTC+2)				Stadium: Stade des Costières

23 April 2005 34	Caen	0–1	Bastia	Caen
CEST (UTC+2)				Stadium: Stade Michel d'Ornano

7 May 2005 35	Marseille	2–3	Caen	Marseille
CEST (UTC+2)				Stadium: Stade Vélodrome

14 May 2005 36	Caen	2–0	Saint-Étienne	Caen
CEST (UTC+2)				Stadium: Stade Michel d'Ornano

21 May 2005 37	Toulouse	2–3	Caen	Toulouse
CEST (UTC+2)				Stadium: Stadium de Toulouse

28 May 2005 38	Istres	3–2	Caen	Fos-sur-Mer
CEST (UTC+2)				Stadium: Stade Parsemain

=== Coupe de France ===
8 January 2005 Round of 64	Mulhouse	0–2	Caen	Mulhouse
15:00 CET (UTC+1)			Dufer 50'; Jovičić 82'	Stadium: Stade de l'Ill; Attendance: 4,116; Referee: Serge Fidri

12 February 2005 Round of 32	Rennes	2–0	Caen	Rennes
20:00 CET (UTC+1)	Monterrubio 45+1'; Maoulida 46'			Stadium: Stade de la Route de Lorient; Attendance: 13,897; Referee: Thierry Auriac

=== Coupe de la Ligue ===
9 November 2004 Round of 32	Ajaccio	0–2	Caen	Ajaccio
21:00 CET (UTC+1)			Jovičić 42'; Deroin 70'	Stadium: Stade François Coty; Attendance: 1,102; Referee: Thierry Auriac

22 December 2004 Round of 16	Sochaux	0–0 (a.e.t.) (3–4 p)	Caen	Montbéliard
16:05 CET (UTC+1)				Stadium: Stade Auguste Bonal; Attendance: 16,182; Referee: Bruno Derrien
	Penalties
	Mathieu (penalty scored); Pitau (penalty scored); Tall (penalty missed); Diawara (penalty missed); Boudarène (penalty scored)		(penalty missed) Ben Askar; (penalty scored) Zubar; (penalty scored) Deroin; (penalty scored) Lemaître; (penalty scored) Danjou

19 January 2005 Quarter-finals	Auxerre	1–1 (a.e.t.) (5–6 p)	Caen	Auxerre
16:05 CET (UTC+1)	Pieroni 107'		Watier 110'	Stadium: Stade de l'Abbé Deschamps; Attendance: 7,000; Referee: Éric Poulat
	Penalties
	Jaurès (penalty scored); Cheyrou (penalty scored); Kalou (penalty scored); Benjani (penalty scored); Pieroni (penalty scored); Mignot (penalty missed)		(penalty scored) Askar; (penalty scored) Zubar; (penalty scored) Watier; (penalty scored) Hengbart; (penalty scored) Deroin; (penalty scored) Jovičić

2 February 2005 Semi-finals	Caen	3–1	Monaco	Caen
21:00 CET (UTC+1)	Mazure 31'; Lemaître 42'; Watier 52' (pen.)		Adebayor 82'; Audard (red card) 64'	Stadium: Stade Michel d'Ornano; Attendance: 18,697; Referee: Philippe Kalt

30 April 2005 Final	Caen	1–2	Strasbourg	Saint-Denis
20:50 CEST (UTC+2)	Mazure 42'		Niang 38'; Devaux 79'	Stadium: Stade de France; Attendance: 78,732; Referee: Gilles Veissière

== Statistics ==
=== Goalscorers ===
Rank	No.	Pos	Nat	Name	Ligue 1	Coupe de France	Coupe de la Ligue	Total
1	9	FW	(France)	Sébastien Mazure	13	0	0	13
2	17	FW	(France)	Cyrille Watier	9	0	0	9
3	20	DF	(France)	Reynald Lemaitre	3	0	0	3
3	7	MF	(France)	Anthony Deroin	2	0	1	3
5	22	DF	(France)	Cédric Hengbart	2	0	0	2
5	11	FW	(Serbia and Montenegro)	Zoran Jovičić	0	1	1	2
Totals					36	2	7	45
