= 2004–05 RC Strasbourg season =

Strasbourg
2004–05 season
- President: Egon Gindorf
- Head coach: Antoine Kombouaré (until October); Jacky Duguépéroux (from October)
- Stadium: Stade de la Meinau
- Ligue 1: 11th
- Coupe de France: Round of 64
- Coupe de la Ligue: Winners
- Top goalscorer: League: Mickaël Pagis (15); All: Mickaël Pagis (16)
- Average home league attendance: 17,465

The 2004–05 season was the 99th season in the existence of RC Strasbourg and the club's third consecutive season in the top flight of French football. In addition to the domestic league, Strasbourg participated in this season's edition of the Coupe de France and the Coupe de la Ligue. The season covered the period from 1 July 2004 to 30 June 2005.

== Competitions ==
=== Overall record ===
Competition	First match	Last match	Starting round	Final position	Record							
Competition	First match	Last match	Starting round	Final position	Pld	W	D	L	GF	GA	GD	Win %
Ligue 1	7 August 2004	28 May 2005	Matchday 1	11th	38	12	12	14	42	43	−1	31.58
Coupe de France	7 January 2005		Round of 64	Round of 64	1	0	0	1	1	3	−2	0.00
Coupe de la Ligue	9 November 2004	30 April 2005	Round of 32	Winners	5	4	1	0	10	5	+5	80.00
Total					44	16	13	15	53	51	+2	36.36

Source: Competitions

=== Ligue 1 ===
==== League table ====
Pos	Team	Pld	W	D	L	GF	GA	GD	Pts	Qualification or relegation
9	Paris Saint-Germain	38	12	15	11	40	41	−1	51	
10	Sochaux	38	13	11	14	42	41	+1	50	
11	Strasbourg	38	12	12	14	42	43	−1	48	Qualification to UEFA Cup first round (Note: Strasbourg was qualified for the 2005–06 UEFA Cup as winners of the 2004–05 Coupe de la Ligue.)
12	Nice	38	10	16	12	38	45	−7	46	
13	Toulouse	38	12	10	16	36	43	−7	46	

Source: Ligue 1
Rules for classification: 1) points; 2) goal difference; 3) number of goals scored.

==== Results summary ====
Overall								Home						Away					
Pld	W	D	L	GF	GA	GD	Pts	W	D	L	GF	GA	GD	W	D	L	GF	GA	GD
38	12	12	14	42	43	−1	48	10	5	4	29	17	+12	2	7	10	13	26	−13

Source: Ligue 1

==== Results by round ====
Round	1	2	3	4	5	6	7	8	9	10	11	12	13	14	15	16	17	18	19	20	21	22	23	24	25	26	27	28	29	30	31	32	33	34	35	36	37	38
Ground	A	H	A	H	A	H	A	A	H	A	H	A	H	A	H	A	H	A	H	A	H	A	H	A	H	H	A	H	A	H	A	H	A	H	A	H	A	H
Result	L	L	D	D	L	D	D	L	L	D	W	L	W	L	W	D	D	L	W	L	D	D	D	L	W	W	L	W	D	L	W	W	D	L	W	W	L	W
Position	13	18	17	17	18	19	19	20	20	20	19	19	18	18	17	18	18	18	15	17	16	16	18	19	16	15	16	15	16	16	14	13	13	14	13	12	12	11

Source: Ligue 1
A = Away; H = Home; W = Win; D = Draw; L = Loss

==== Matches ====
7 August 2004 1	Bastia	2–1	Strasbourg
CEST (UTC+2)

14 August 2004 2	Strasbourg	1–4	Toulouse
CEST (UTC+2)

21 August 2004 3	Saint-Étienne	1–1	Strasbourg
CEST (UTC+2)

28 August 2004 4	Strasbourg	1–1	Istres
CEST (UTC+2)

11 September 2004 5	Monaco	3–1	Strasbourg
CEST (UTC+2)

18 September 2004 6	Strasbourg	2–2	Lens
CEST (UTC+2)

22 September 2004 7	Caen	0–0	Strasbourg
CEST (UTC+2)

25 September 2004 8	Paris Saint-Germain	1–0	Strasbourg
CEST (UTC+2)

2 October 2004 9	Strasbourg	0–2	Nantes
CEST (UTC+2)

16 October 2004 10	Ajaccio	2–2	Strasbourg
CEST (UTC+2)

23 October 2004 11	Strasbourg	3–1	Nice
CEST (UTC+2)

30 October 2004 12	Lyon	1–0	Strasbourg
CEST (UTC+2)

6 November 2004 13	Strasbourg	1–0	Bordeaux
CEST (UTC+2)

13 November 2004 14	Marseille	2–0	Strasbourg
CEST (UTC+2)

20 November 2004 15	Strasbourg	3–1	Auxerre
CEST (UTC+2)

28 November 2004 16	Lille	1–1	Strasbourg
CEST (UTC+2)

4 December 2004 17	Strasbourg	0–0	Sochaux
CEST (UTC+2)

11 December 2004 18	Metz	1–0	Strasbourg
CEST (UTC+2)

18 December 2004 19	Strasbourg	1–0	Rennes
CEST (UTC+2)

12 January 2005 20	Toulouse	2–0	Strasbourg
CEST (UTC+2)

15 January 2005 21	Strasbourg	1–1	Saint-Étienne
CEST (UTC+2)

22 January 2005 22	Istres	1–1	Strasbourg
CEST (UTC+2)

29 January 2005 24	Lens	2–1	Strasbourg
CEST (UTC+2)

5 February 2005 25	Strasbourg	5–0	Caen
CEST (UTC+2)

19 February 2005 26	Strasbourg	3–1	Paris Saint-Germain
CEST (UTC+2)

26 February 2005 27	Nantes	2–1	Strasbourg
CEST (UTC+2)

5 March 2005 28	Strasbourg	1–0	Ajaccio
CEST (UTC+2)

12 March 2005 29	Nice	0–0	Strasbourg
CEST (UTC+2)

16 March 2005 23	Strasbourg	0–0	Monaco
CEST (UTC+2)

19 March 2005 30	Strasbourg	0–1	Lyon
CEST (UTC+2)

2 April 2005 31	Bordeaux	0–2	Strasbourg
CEST (UTC+2)

9 April 2005 32	Strasbourg	1–0	Marseille
CEST (UTC+2)

17 April 2005 33	Auxerre	0–0	Strasbourg
CEST (UTC+2)

23 April 2005 34	Strasbourg	1–2	Lille
CEST (UTC+2)

7 May 2005 35	Sochaux	1–2	Strasbourg
CEST (UTC+2)

14 May 2005 36	Strasbourg	3–1	Metz
CEST (UTC+2)

21 May 2005 37	Rennes	4–0	Strasbourg
CEST (UTC+2)

28 May 2005 38	Strasbourg	2–0	Bastia
20:00 CEST (UTC+2)

=== Coupe de France ===
7 January 2005 Round of 64	Sedan	3–1	Strasbourg	Sedan
19:15 CET (UTC+1)				Stadium: Stade Louis Dugauguez; Attendance: 5,933; Referee: Laurent Duhamel

=== Coupe de la Ligue ===
9 November 2004 Round of 32	Troyes	1–3	Strasbourg	Troyes
21:00 CET (UTC+1)				Stadium: Stade de l'Aube; Attendance: 5,838; Referee: Tony Chapron

21 December 2004 Round of 16	Strasbourg	1–1 (a.e.t.) (4–2 p)	Lille	Strasbourg
21:00 CET (UTC+1)				Stadium: Stade de la Meinau; Attendance: 7,844; Referee: Hervé Piccirillo

19 January 2005 Quarter-finals	Strasbourg	3–2	Clermont	Strasbourg
21:00 CET (UTC+1)				Stadium: Stade de la Meinau; Attendance: 5,260; Referee: Damien Ledentu

1 February 2005 Semi-finals	Strasbourg	1–0	Saint-Étienne	Strasbourg
21:00 CEST (UTC+2)				Stadium: Stade de la Meinau; Attendance: 11,487; Referee: Pascal Viléo

30 April 2005 Final	Caen	1–2	Strasbourg	Saint-Denis
20:50 CEST (UTC+2)	Mazure 42'		Niang 38'; Devaux 79'	Stadium: Stade de France; Attendance: 78,732; Referee: Gilles Veissière

== Statistics ==
=== Goalscorers ===
Rank	No.	Pos	Nat	Name	Ligue 1	Coupe de France	Coupe de la Ligue	Total
1	25	DF	(France)	[[]]	0	0	0	0
1	8	MF	(France)	[[]]	0	0	0	0
1	17	MF	(France)	[[]]	0	0	0	0
1	27	FW	(France)	[[]]	0	0	0	1
Totals					0	0	0	0
