= 2005 Coupe de la Ligue final =

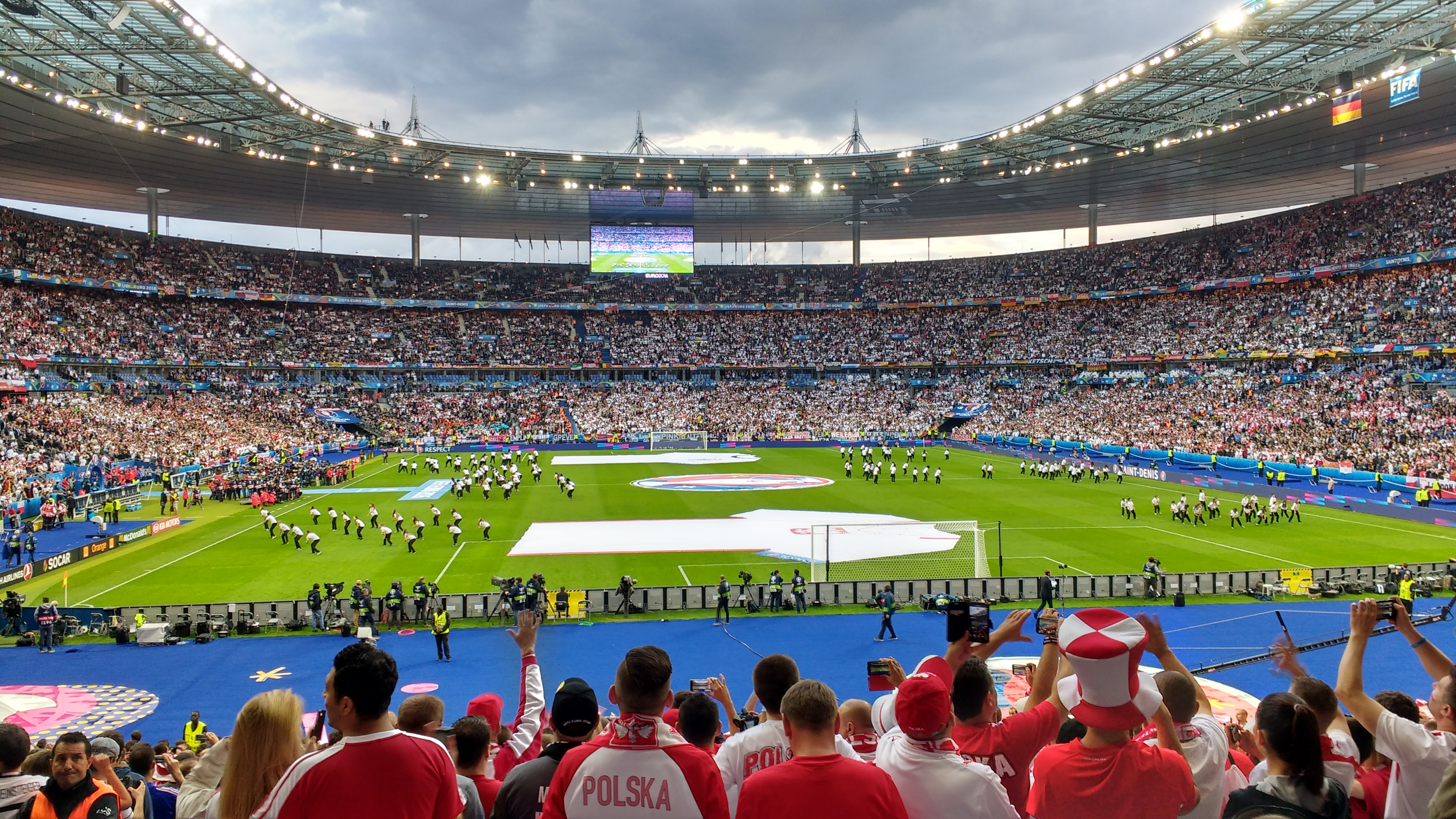
- Event: 2004–05 Coupe de la Ligue
| Caen | Strasbourg |
| Ligue 1 | Ligue 1 |
| 1 | 2 |
- Date: 30 April 2005
- Venue: Stade de France, Saint-Denis
- Referee: Gilles Veissière
- Attendance: 78,732

The 2005 Coupe de la Ligue final was a football match held at Stade de France, Saint-Denis on 30 April 2005, that saw Strasbourg defeat Caen 2–1 thanks to goals by Mamadou Niang and Jean-Christophe Devaux.

== Route to the final ==
Note: In all results below, the score of the finalist is given first (H: home; A: away).

| Caen | | Round | Strasbourg | |
|---|---|---|---|---|
| Opponent | Result | 2004–05 Coupe de la Ligue | Opponent | Result |
| Ajaccio (A) | 2–0 | Second round | Troyes (A) | 3–1 |
| Sochaux (A) | 0–0 (a.e.t.) (4–3 p) | Round of 16 | Lille (H) | 1–1 (a.e.t.) (4–2 p) |
| Auxerre (A) | 1–1 (a.e.t.) (6–5 p) | Quarter-finals | Clermont (H) | 3–2 |
| Monaco (H) | 3–1 | Semi-finals | Saint-Étienne (H) | 1–0 |

== Match details ==
30 April 2005
20:45

| Caen | 1–2 | Strasbourg |
|---|---|---|
| Mazure 42' | | Niang 38'; Devaux 79' |

Stade de France, Saint-Denis
Attendance: 78,732
Referee: Gilles Veissière

SM CAEN:
| GK | 16 | (France) Vincent Planté |
| DF | 2 | (France) Nicolas Seube |
| DF | 5 | (Morocco) Aziz Ben Askar (c) |
| DF | 6 | (France) Ronald Zubar | (substituted off) 84' |
| DF | 21 | (Senegal) Ibrahima Faye |
| MF | 4 | (Belgium) Steve Dugardein | (substituted off) 89' |
| MF | 33 | (France) Jérémy Sorbon |
| MF | 7 | (France) Anthony Deroin |
| MF | 20 | (France) Reynald Lemaître |
| FW | 9 | (France) Sébastien Mazure |
| FW | 14 | (France) Yohann Eudeline | (substituted off) 75' |
Substitutes:
| MF | 29 | (France) Benoît Lesoimier | (substituted on) 75' |
| FW | 17 | (France) Cyrille Watier | (substituted on) 84' |
| MF | 15 | (France) Jimmy Hebert | (substituted on) 89' |
Unused substitutes:
| GK | 1 | (France) Steeve Elana |
| DF | 22 | (France) Cédric Hengbart |
Manager:
(France) Patrick Rémy Assistant Referees: Fourth Official:

RC STRASBOURG:
| GK | 22 | (France) Rémy Vercoutre |
| DF | 3 | (France) Jean-Christophe Devaux |
| DF | 5 | (Mali) Cédric Kanté (c) |
| DF | 15 | (Ivory Coast) Arthur Boka | (substituted off) 86' |
| MF | 7 | (Sweden) Alexander Farnerud |
| MF | 18 | (France) Pascal Johansen |
| MF | 19 | (France) Guillaume Lacour |
| MF | 20 | (Morocco) Yacine Abdessadki | (substituted off) 70' |
| MF | 24 | (Mali) Sidi Yaya Keita |
| FW | 9 | (France) Mickaël Pagis |
| FW | 11 | (Senegal) Mamadou Niang |
Substitutes:
| DF | 2 | (France) Yves Deroff | (substituted on) 70' |
| MF | 14 | (France) Ulrich Le Pen | (substituted on) 86' |
Unused substitutes:
| GK | 16 | (France) Stéphane Cassard |
| DF | 4 | (France) Christian Bassila |
| FW | 13 | (Algeria) Salim Arrache |
Manager:
(France) Jacky Duguépéroux

== See also ==
- 2005 Coupe de France final
- 2004–05 Stade Malherbe Caen season
- 2004–05 RC Strasbourg season
