= 2004–05 Stade de Reims season =

Reims
2004–05 season
- Head coach: Ladislas Lozano (until 11 April); Jean-Claude Cloët
- Stadium: Stade Auguste-Delaune
- Ligue 2: 16th
- Coupe de France: Round of 32
- Coupe de la Ligue: Round of 32
- Top goalscorer: League: Thomas Dossevi; Amara Diané (8 each); All: Thomas Dossevi; Amara Diané (8 each)
- Average home league attendance: 7,339

The 2004–05 season was Stade de Reims's 74th season in existence and the club's first season back in the second division of French football. In addition to the domestic league, Reims participated in this season's editions of the Coupe de France, and the Coupe de la Ligue.

== Transfers ==
=== In ===
No.	Pos.	Player	Transferred from	Fee	Date	Source
	FW	(France) Jérémy Blayac	Toulouse	Free	1 July 2004	
	DF	(France) Christophe Delmotte	Lyon		1 July 2004	

== Competitions ==
=== Overall record ===
Competition	First match	Last match	Starting round	Final position	Record							
Competition	First match	Last match	Starting round	Final position	Pld	W	D	L	GF	GA	GD	Win %
Ligue 2	6 August 2004	27 May 2005	Matchday 1	16th	38	10	13	15	34	55	−21	26.32
Coupe de France	20 November 2004	7 January 2005	Seventh round	Round of 32	4	1	2	1	5	4	+1	25.00
Coupe de la Ligue	8 October 2004	9 November 2004	First round	Round of 32	2	0	1	1	3	5	−2	0.00
Total					44	11	16	17	42	64	−22	25.00

Source: Competitions

=== Ligue 2 ===
==== League table ====
Pos	Team	Pld	W	D	L	GF	GA	GD	Pts
14	Laval	38	13	8	17	43	51	−8	47
15	Créteil	38	11	13	14	42	38	+4	46
16	Reims	38	10	13	15	34	55	−21	43
17	Le Havre	38	11	9	18	28	42	−14	42
18	Clermont	38	8	15	15	34	39	−5	39

Source: Ligue 2

==== Results summary ====
Overall								Home						Away					
Pld	W	D	L	GF	GA	GD	Pts	W	D	L	GF	GA	GD	W	D	L	GF	GA	GD
38	10	13	15	34	55	−21	43	8	6	5	23	23	0	2	7	10	11	32	−21

Source: Ligue 2

==== Results by round ====
Round	1	2	3	4	5	6	7	8	9	10	11	12	13	14	15	16	17	18	19	20	21	22	23	24	25	26	27	28	29	30	31	32	33	34	35	36	37	38
Ground	H	H	A	H	A	H	A	H	A	H	A	H	A	H	A	H	A	H	A	A	H	A	H	A	H	A	H	A	H	A	H	A	H	A	H	A	H	A
Result	W	W	D	W	L	D	L	D	D	L	D	W	L	L	L	W	W	D	D	W	L	D	W	L	D	L	D	D	L	L	D	L	L	L	W	D	W	L
Position	5	2	4	1	2	3	8	7	9	9	10	7	10	15	17	14	11	12	14	10	13	13	11	11	10	13	12	12	13	15	15	15	15	16	16	17	16	16

Source: Ligue 2
A = Away; H = Home; W = Win; D = Draw; L = Loss

==== Matches ====
6 August 2004 1	Reims	2–1	US Créteil-Lusitanos	Reims
--:-- CEST (UTC+2)	Blayac 56'; Diané 67'		Pataca 13'	Stadium: Stade Auguste-Delaune; Attendance: 6,704; Referee: Olivier Lamarre

13 August 2004 2	Reims	2–0	Stade Lavallois	Reims
--:-- CEST (UTC+2)	Diané 7'; Delmotte 89' (pen.)			Stadium: Stade Auguste-Delaune; Attendance: 6,672; Referee: Jean-Charles Cailleux

17 August 2004 3	Le Mans	0–0	Reims	Le Mans
--:-- CEST (UTC+2)				Stadium: Stade Léon-Bollée; Attendance: 5,867; Referee: Alexandre Castro

20 August 2004 4	Reims	2–1	Gueugnon	Reims
--:-- CEST (UTC+2)	Delmotte 20' (pen.), 84'		Hissein 12'	Stadium: Stade Auguste-Delaune; Attendance: 6,361; Referee: Eric Brocas

27 August 2004 5	Le Havre	3–1	Reims	Le Havre
--:-- CEST (UTC+2)

3 September 2004 6	Reims	1–1	Grenoble	Reims
--:-- CEST (UTC+2)				Stadium: Stade Auguste-Delaune

12 September 2004 7	Brest	4–2	Reims	Brest
--:-- CEST (UTC+2)				Stadium: Stade Francis le Blé; Attendance: 8,111; Referee: Olivier Thual

17 September 2004 8	Reims	0–0	Sedan	Reims
--:-- CEST (UTC+2)				Stadium: Stade Auguste-Delaune

22 September 2004 9	Châteauroux	1–1	Reims	Châteauroux
--:-- CEST (UTC+2)

25 September 2004 10	Reims	0–2	Montpellier	Reims
--:-- CEST (UTC+2)				Stadium: Stade Auguste-Delaune

4 October 2004 11	Dijon	0–0	Reims	Dijon
--:-- CEST (UTC+2)				Stadium: Stade Gaston Gérard

15 October 2004 12	Reims	2–0	Troyes	Reims
--:-- CEST (UTC+2)				Stadium: Stade Auguste-Delaune

22 October 2004 13	Angers	3–0	Reims	Angers
--:-- CEST (UTC+2)				Stadium: Stade Raymond Kopa

29 October 2004 14	Reims	1–4	Lorient	Reims
--:-- CET (UTC+1)				Stadium: Stade Auguste-Delaune

5 November 2004 15	Nancy	3–1	Reims	Tomblaine
--:-- CET (UTC+1)				Stadium: Stade Marcel Picot

13 November 2004 16	Reims	3–2	Guingamp	Reims
--:-- CET (UTC+1)				Stadium: Stade Auguste-Delaune

26 November 2004 17	Niort	0–1	Reims	Niort
--:-- CET (UTC+1)

3 December 2004 18	Reims	0–0	Amiens	Reims
--:-- CET (UTC+1)				Stadium: Stade Auguste-Delaune

17 December 2004 19	Clermont	0–0	Reims	Clermont-Ferrand
--:-- CET (UTC+1)

11 January 2005 20	Laval	1–2	Reims	Laval
--:-- CET (UTC+1)

14 January 2005 21	Reims	0–1	Le Mans	Reims
--:-- CET (UTC+1)				Stadium: Stade Auguste-Delaune

21 January 2005 22	Gueugnon	1–1	Reims	Gueugnon
--:-- CET (UTC+1)

25 January 2005 23	Reims	3–0	Le Havre	Reims
--:-- CET (UTC+1)

4 February 2005 25	Reims	0–0	Brest	Reims
--:-- CET (UTC+1)				Stadium: Stade Auguste-Delaune

18 February 2005 26	Sedan	2–0	Reims	Sedan
--:-- CET (UTC+1)

22 February 2005 24	Grenoble	2–0	Reims	Grenoble
--:-- CET (UTC+1)

25 February 2005 27	Reims	1–1	Châteauroux	Reims
--:-- CET (UTC+1)				Stadium: Stade Auguste-Delaune

4 March 2005 28	Montpellier	0–0	Reims	Montpellier
--:-- CET (UTC+1)				Stadium: Stade de la Mosson

11 March 2005 29	Reims	0–5	Dijon	Reims
--:-- CET (UTC+1)				Stadium: Stade Auguste-Delaune

21 March 2005 30	Troyes	2–0	Reims	Troyes
--:-- CET (UTC+1)

1 April 2005 31	Reims	1–1	Angers	Reims
--:-- CET (UTC+1)				Stadium: Stade Auguste-Delaune

8 April 2005 32	Lorient	3–1	Reims	Lorient
--:-- CET (UTC+1)

15 April 2005 33	Reims	0–4	Nancy	Reims
--:-- CET (UTC+1)				Stadium: Stade Auguste-Delaune

22 April 2005 34	Guingamp	2–0	Reims	Guingamp
--:-- CET (UTC+1)

6 May 2005 35	Reims	2–0	Niort	Reims
--:-- CET (UTC+1)				Stadium: Stade Auguste-Delaune

13 May 2005 36	Amiens	1–1	Reims	Amiens
--:-- CET (UTC+1)

20 May 2005 37	Reims	3–0	Clermont	Reims
--:-- CET (UTC+1)				Stadium: Stade Auguste-Delaune

27 May 2005 38	US Créteil-Lusitanos	4–0	Reims	Créteil
--:-- CET (UTC+1)

=== Coupe de France ===
20 November 2004 Seventh round	CSO Amnéville	1–1 (3–4 p)	Reims	Amnéville
--:-- CET (UTC+1)	Arnaud 75' (.o.g.)		Viale 14'	Stadium: Stade Municipal; Referee: Franck Guillon

11 December 2004 Eighth round	US Saint-Omer	0–1	Reims	Saint-Omer
--:-- CET (UTC+1)			Diané 82'	Stadium: Stade Gaston-Bonnet; Referee: Gael Lecellier

8 January 2005 Round of 64	SC Schiltigheim	0–2	Reims	Schiltigheim
--:-- CET (UTC+1)			Blayac 23'; Diané 53'	Stadium: Stade de l'Aar; Attendance: 2,090; Referee: Jean-Charles Cailleux

11 February 2005 Round of 32	Nice	3–1 (a.e.t.)	Reims	Nice
20:45 CET (UTC+1)				Stadium: Stade du Ray; Attendance: 5,176; Referee: Pascal Viléo

=== Coupe de la Ligue ===
8 October 2004 First round	Nancy	2–2 (3–5 p)	Reims	Tomblaine
--:-- CEST (UTC+2)	Puygrenier 6'; Fayolle 66'		Arnaud 45'; Hebbar 72'	Stadium: Stade Marcel-Picot; Attendance: 9,610; Referee: Eric Brocas

9 November 2004 Round of 32	Montpellier	3–1	Reims	Montpellier
19:00 CET (UTC+1)	Lafourcade 48'; Atik 55'; Cissé 79'		Diané 38'	Stadium: Stade de la Mosson; Attendance: 3,531; Referee: Jean-Marc Bonnin
