= 2004–05 Toulouse FC season =

Toulouse
2004–05 season
- President: Damien Comolli
- Head coach: Erick Mombaerts
- Stadium: Stadium de Toulouse
- Ligue 1: 13th
- Coupe de France: Round of 32
- Top goalscorer: Daniel Moreira (11)

The 2004–05 season was the 35th season in the history of Toulouse FC and the club's second consecutive season in the top flight of French football. In addition to the domestic league, Toulouse participated in this season's editions of the Coupe de France and the Coupe de la Ligue.

== Competitions ==
=== Overall record ===
Competition	First match	Last match	Starting round	Final position	Record							
Competition	First match	Last match	Starting round	Final position	Pld	W	D	L	GF	GA	GD	Win %
Ligue 1	7 August 2004	28 May 2005	Matchday 1	13th	38	12	10	16	36	43	−7	31.58
Coupe de France	7 January 2005	12 February 2005	Round of 64	Round of 32	2	1	0	1	4	2	+2	50.00
Coupe de la Ligue	9 November 2004		Round of 32	Round of 32	1	0	1	0	0	0	+0	0.00
Total					41	13	11	17	40	45	−5	31.71

Source: Competitions

=== Ligue 1 ===
==== League table ====
Pos	Team	Pld	W	D	L	GF	GA	GD	Pts	Qualification or relegation
11	Strasbourg	38	12	12	14	42	43	−1	48	Qualification to UEFA Cup first round (Note: Strasbourg was qualified for the 2005–06 UEFA Cup as winners of the 2004–05 Coupe de la Ligue.)
12	Nice	38	10	16	12	38	45	−7	46	
13	Toulouse	38	12	10	16	36	43	−7	46	
14	Ajaccio	38	10	15	13	36	40	−4	45	
15	Bordeaux	38	8	20	10	37	41	−4	44	

Source: Ligue 1
Rules for classification: 1) points; 2) goal difference; 3) number of goals scored.

==== Results summary ====
Overall								Home						Away					
Pld	W	D	L	GF	GA	GD	Pts	W	D	L	GF	GA	GD	W	D	L	GF	GA	GD
38	12	10	16	36	43	−7	46	9	4	6	20	19	+1	3	6	10	16	24	−8

Source: worldfootball.net

==== Results by round ====
Round	1	2	3	4	5	6	7	8	9	10	11	12	13	14	15	16	17	18	19	20	21	22	23	24	25	26	27	28	29	30	31	32	33	34	35	36	37	38
Ground	H	A	H	A	H	A	H	A	H	A	H	A	H	A	H	H	A	H	A	H	A	H	A	H	A	H	A	H	A	H	A	H	A	A	H	A	H	A
Result	D	W	W	D	W	L	L	D	L	L	W	L	D	D	W	D	D	W	W	W	D	W	L	L	L	W	L	W	D	D	W	L	L	L	L	L	L	L
Position	11	4	2	4	1	5	8	7	8	11	7	11	11	10	8	8	8	8	6	6	6	6	6	6	7	6	6	6	6	6	6	7	8	10	11	11	11	13

A = Away; H = Home; W = Win; D = Draw; L = Loss

==== Matches ====
7 August 2004 1	Toulouse	0–0	Lens	Toulouse
CEST (UTC+2)				Stadium: Stadium de Toulouse

14 August 2004 2	Strasbourg	1–4	Toulouse	Strasbourg
20:00 CEST (UTC+2)

21 August 2004 3	Toulouse	2–1	Paris Saint-Germain	Toulouse
CEST (UTC+2)				Stadium: Stadium de Toulouse

28 August 2004 4	Nantes	2–2	Toulouse	Nantes
20:00 CEST (UTC+2)

11 September 2004 5	Toulouse	3–1	Ajaccio	Toulouse
CEST (UTC+2)				Stadium: Stadium de Toulouse

18 September 2004 6	Marseille	1–0	Toulouse	Marseille
20:00 CEST (UTC+2)

21 September 2004 7	Toulouse	0–2	Lyon	Toulouse
CEST (UTC+2)				Stadium: Stadium de Toulouse

25 September 2004 8	Bordeaux	1–1	Toulouse	Bordeaux
20:00 CEST (UTC+2)

3 October 2004 9	Toulouse	1–2	Auxerre	Toulouse
CEST (UTC+2)				Stadium: Stadium de Toulouse

16 October 2004 10	Nice	1–0	Toulouse	Nice
20:00 CEST (UTC+2)

24 October 2004 11	Toulouse	1–0	Lille	Toulouse
CEST (UTC+2)				Stadium: Stadium de Toulouse

30 October 2004 12	Sochaux	2–0	Toulouse	Sochaux
17:15 CET (UTC+1)

6 November 2004 13	Toulouse	1–1	Metz	Toulouse
CEST (UTC+2)				Stadium: Stadium de Toulouse

13 November 2004 14	Rennes	1–1	Toulouse	Rennes
20:00 CET (UTC+1)

20 November 2004 15	Toulouse	1–0	Bastia	Toulouse
CEST (UTC+2)				Stadium: Stadium de Toulouse

27 November 2004 16	Toulouse	0–0	Monaco	Toulouse
CEST (UTC+2)				Stadium: Stadium de Toulouse

4 December 2004 17	Saint-Étienne	0–0	Toulouse	Saint-Étienne
20:00 CET (UTC+1)

11 December 2004 18	Toulouse	2–1	Istres	Toulouse
CEST (UTC+2)				Stadium: Stadium de Toulouse

18 December 2004 19	Caen	0–2	Toulouse	Caen
20:00 CET (UTC+1)

12 January 2005 20	Toulouse	2–0	Strasbourg	Toulouse
CEST (UTC+2)				Stadium: Stadium de Toulouse

15 January 2005 21	Paris Saint-Germain	0–0	Toulouse	Paris
20:00 CET (UTC+1)

22 January 2005 22	Toulouse	2–1	Nantes	Toulouse
CEST (UTC+2)				Stadium: Stadium de Toulouse

26 January 2005 23	Ajaccio	1–0	Toulouse	Ajaccio
20:30 CET (UTC+1)

29 January 2005 24	Toulouse	1–3	Marseille	Toulouse
CEST (UTC+2)				Stadium: Stadium de Toulouse

5 February 2005 25	Lyon	4–0	Toulouse	Lyon
20:00 CET (UTC+1)

19 February 2005 26	Toulouse	1–0	Bordeaux	Toulouse
CEST (UTC+2)				Stadium: Stadium de Toulouse

5 March 2005 28	Toulouse	1–0	Nice	Toulouse
CEST (UTC+2)				Stadium: Stadium de Toulouse

13 March 2005 29	Lille	1–1	Toulouse	Lille
18:00 CET (UTC+1)

19 March 2005 30	Toulouse	0–0	Sochaux	Toulouse
CEST (UTC+2)				Stadium: Stadium de Toulouse

2 April 2005 31	Metz	0–1	Toulouse	Metz
20:00 CEST (UTC+2)

9 April 2005 32	Toulouse	0–2	Rennes	Toulouse
CEST (UTC+2)				Stadium: Stadium de Toulouse

16 April 2005 33	Bastia	2–1	Toulouse	Furiani
20:00 CEST (UTC+2)

23 April 2005 34	Monaco	2–1	Toulouse	Monaco
17:15 CEST (UTC+2)

29 April 2005 27	Auxerre	3–2	Toulouse	Auxerre
20:00 CEST (UTC+2)

7 May 2005 35	Toulouse	0–2	Saint-Étienne	Toulouse
CEST (UTC+2)				Stadium: Stadium de Toulouse

14 May 2005 36	Istres	1–0	Toulouse	Istres
20:00 CEST (UTC+2)

21 May 2005 37	Toulouse	2–3	Caen	Toulouse
19:45 CEST (UTC+2)				Stadium: Stadium de Toulouse; Attendance: 18,996; Referee: Philippe Malige

28 May 2005 38	Lens	1–0	Toulouse	Lens
19:00 CEST (UTC+2)				Stadium: Stade Bollaert-Delelis

=== Coupe de France ===
7 January 2005 Round of 64	Gambsheim	0–3	Toulouse	Gambsheim
CET (UTC+1)

12 February 2005 Round of 32	Toulouse	1–2	Lyon	Toulouse
CET (UTC+1)

=== Coupe de la Ligue ===
9 November 2004 Round of 32	Clermont	0–0	Toulouse	Clermont-Ferrand
CET (UTC+1)
