= Rémy Vercoutre =

French footballer (born 1980)

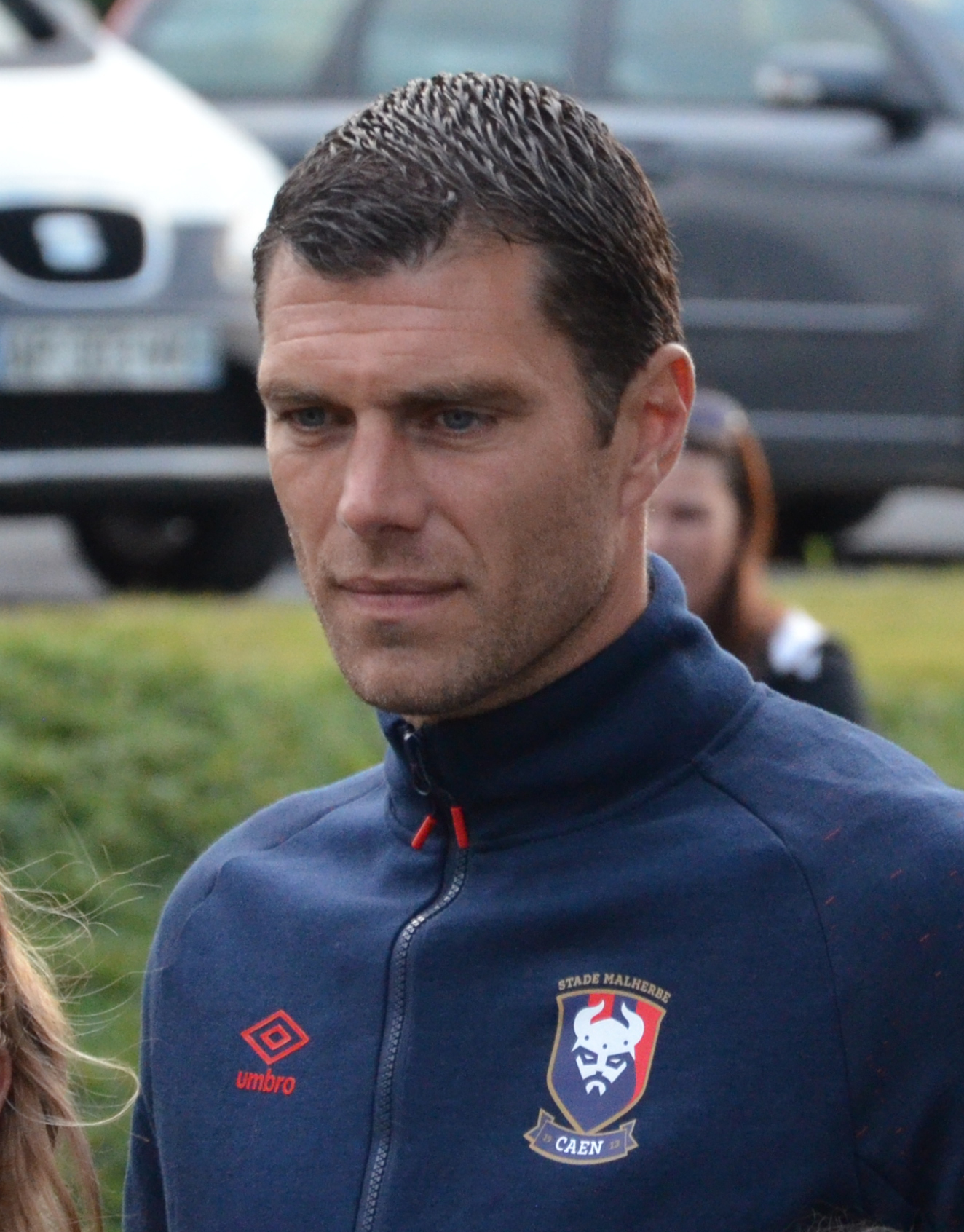
- Vercoutre with Caen in 2016

Personal information
- Full name: Rémy René Paul Vercoutre
- Date of birth: 26 June 1980 (age 46)
- Place of birth: Grande-Synthe, Nord, France
- Height: 1.85 m (6 ft 1 in)
- Position: Goalkeeper

Team information
- Current team: Lyon (goalkeeping coach)

Senior career*
Years	Team	Apps	(Gls)
1996–2002	Montpellier	36	(0)
2002–2014	Lyon	76	(0)
2004–2005	→ Strasbourg (loan)	5	(0)
2014–2018	Caen	145	(0)
Total		262	(0)
- * Club domestic league appearances and goals

Rémy René Paul Vercoutre (born 26 June 1980) is a French former professional footballer who played as a goalkeeper. He is the goalkeeping coach of Lyon.

== Career ==
Vercoutre was born in Grande-Synthe, Nord. He previously played for Montpellier, before moving to Lyon in 2002. In 2004, he joined Strasbourg on loan, but only managed to play eight games for them before returning to Lyon. He did however play as they won the 2005 Coupe de la Ligue Final.

Due to Grégory Coupet's injury for the 2007 portion of the 2007–08 Ligue 1 season, Vercoutre became Lyon's first choice keeper and played in every game until Coupet's return. During that time, he made a crucial penalty save from Thomas Hitzlsperger in the UEFA Champions League against Stuttgart, which helped Lyon progress to the round of 16.

After the departure of Hugo Lloris to Tottenham Hotspur in August 2012, Vercoutre became the first choice goalkeeper for Lyon. At the end of the 2012–13 season, however, he lost the first-choice place to Anthony Lopes.

In June 2014, Vercoutre left Lyon 12 years after his arrival to sign a two-year contract with newly promoted Ligue 1 side Caen.

== Career statistics ==
Appearances and goals by club, season and competition
Club	Season	League			National cup		League cup		Europe		Other		Total	
Club	Season	Division	Apps	Goals	Apps	Goals	Apps	Goals	Apps	Goals	Apps	Goals	Apps	Goals
Montpellier	1998–99	Division 1	1	0	0	0	0	0	—		—		1	0
Montpellier	1999–2000	Division 1	0	0	—		—		0	0	—		0	0
Montpellier	2000–01	Division 2	20	0	1	0	1	0	—		—		22	0
Montpellier	2001–02	Division 1	15	0	2	0	1	0	—		—		18	0
Montpellier	Total		36	0	3	0	2	0	—		—		41	0
Lyon	2002–03	Ligue 1	2	0	0	0	0	0	0	0	0	0	2	0
Lyon	2003–04	Ligue 1	3	0	0	0	1	0	1	0	0	0	5	0
Lyon	2005–06	Ligue 1	2	0	0	0	1	0	1	0	0	0	4	0
Lyon	2006–07	Ligue 1	5	0	2	0	4	0	1	0	1	0	13	0
Lyon	2007–08	Ligue 1	19	0	0	0	1	0	6	0	0	0	26	0
Lyon	2008–09	Ligue 1	3	0	1	0	1	0	0	0	0	0	5	0
Lyon	2009–10	Ligue 1	2	0	0	0	2	0	0	0	—		4	0
Lyon	2010–11	Ligue 1	1	0	0	0	1	0	0	0	—		2	0
Lyon	2011–12	Ligue 1	3	0	0	0	1	0	0	0	—		4	0
Lyon	2012–13	Ligue 1	31	0	1	0	0	0	7	0	0	0	39	0
Lyon	2013–14	Ligue 1	5	0	3	0	0	0	2	0	—		10	0
Lyon	Total		76	0	7	0	12	0	18	0	1	0	114	0
Strasbourg (loan)	2004–05	Ligue 1	5	0	1	0	5	0	—		—		11	0
Caen	2014–15	Ligue 1	38	0	1	0	0	0	—		—		39	0
Caen	2015–16	Ligue 1	38	0	1	0	0	0	—		—		39	0
Caen	2016–17	Ligue 1	34	0	1	0	0	0	—		—		35	0
Caen	2017–18	Ligue 1	35	0	1	0	0	0	—		—		36	0
Caen	Total		145	0	4	0	0	0	—		—		149	0
Career total			262	0	15	0	19	0	18	0	1	0	315	0

== Honours ==
Lyon

- Ligue 1: 2006–07, 2007–08
- Coupe de France: 2007–08, 2011–12
- Trophée des Champions: 2003, 2005, 2006, 2007, 2012

Strasbourg

- Coupe de la Ligue: 2004–05
