= 2004–05 Ligue 1 =

67th season of top-tier French football

Ligue 1
- Season: 2004–05
- Dates: 6 August 2004 – 28 May 2005
- Champions: Lyon (4th Title)
- Relegated: Caen; Bastia; Istres
- Champions League: Lyon; Lille; Monaco
- UEFA Cup: Rennes; Auxerre; Strasbourg
- Matches: 380
- Goals: 826 (2.17 per match)
- Top goalscorer: Alexander Frei (20 goals)

The 2004–05 season of Ligue 1 was a very close-run battle. Separating fourth placed Rennes, who enter the UEFA Cup and 18th placed Caen, who get relegated to Ligue 2, were just 13 points. Lyon were long time leaders and had won the league back in April 2005. On the last day, 4 teams could have got the 4th place guaranteeing a place in the UEFA Cup and any 2 from 6 teams could have been relegated before the final games.

== Participating teams ==
Location of teams in 2004–05 Ligue 1
- Ajaccio
- Auxerre
- Bastia
- Bordeaux
- Caen
- Istres
- Lens
- Lille
- Lyon
- Marseille
- Metz
- Monaco
- Nantes
- Nice
- Paris Saint-Germain
- Rennes
- Saint-Étienne
- Sochaux
- Strasbourg
- Toulouse

== Personnel and kits ==
Team	Manager	Kit manufacturer	Shirt sponsors (front)	Shirt sponsors (back)	Shirt sponsors (sleeve)	Shorts sponsors
Ajaccio	(France) Rolland Courbis	Baliston	Géant Casino	None	Conseil Général de la Corse du Sud, Collectivité Territoriale de Corse	None
Auxerre	(France) Guy Roux	Uhlsport	PlayStation 2	Eurotyre	None	None
Bastia	(France) Michel Padovani & (France) Éric Durand (caretakers)	Uhlsport	Géant Casino, Pago Premium Fruit Juice	None	Groupe Onet, Conseil départemental de la Haute-Corse	Nouvelles Frontières
Bordeaux	(France) Michel Pavon	Puma	Motorola	None	Groupe M6	Motorola
Caen	(France) Franck Dumas	Erreà	Isigny Sainte-Mère (Home) / Philips (Away & Third), Brittany Ferries	Philips (Home) / Conseil régional de Basse-Normandie(Away)	Guy Dauphin Environnement	Guy Dauphin Environnement
Istres	(Bosnia and Herzegovina) Mehmed Baždarević	Baliston	Ouest Provence / ParuVendu, K-Sport	Fidelidade	None	None
Lens	(France) Francis Gillot	Nike	Orange	Orange	None	None
Lille	(France) Claude Puel	Kipsta	Partouche Casino	Partouche Casino	None	None
Lyon	(France) Paul Le Guen	Umbro	Renault Trucks (H)/LG Mobile (A), NC Numericable, Renault Trucks	LG Mobile	Fertiligène	ISS
Marseille	(France) Philippe Troussier	Adidas	Neuf	Creyf's Interim	Indesit	Quick
Metz	(France) Jean Fernandez	Puma	Sollac, Moselle	None	Cora	BigBen Interactive
Monaco	(France) Didier Deschamps	Puma	Fedcom	Gian Alberto Caporale	None	Monaco Telecom
Nantes	(France) Serge Le Dizet	Le Coq Sportif	Synergie Interim (Home) / Paprec Recyclage (Away), Pays de la Loire	Paprec Recyclage (Home) / Synergie Interim (Away)	Hero by Wrangler	Hero by Wrangler
Nice	(France) Frédéric Antonetti	Puma	Rica Lewis (Home) / Gorenje (Away), RMC	Gorenje (Home) / Rica Lewis (Away)	Pizzorno Environnement	Pizzorno Environnement
Paris Saint-Germain	(France) Laurent Fournier	Nike	Thomson	32 75 La Ligne Officielle PSG	32 75 La Ligne Officielle PSG	Poweo
Rennes	(Romania) László Bölöni	Airness	Conforama (Home) / Fiat Utilitaires (Away), Samsic Propreté, Rennes	Fiat Utilitaires (Home) / Conforama(Away)	Association ELA	None
Saint-Étienne	(France) Élie Baup	Duarig	Konica Minolta, Conseil général de la Loire en Rhône-Alpes	Vocalcom	Loire, SACMA Agencements	Saint-Étienne
Sochaux	(France) Guy Lacombe	Lotto	Esso, Franche-Comté	Alliance Intérim	Megnin Bernard	Peugeot
Strasbourg	(France) Jacky Duguépéroux	Adidas	Steelcase (Home) / Europe 2 (Away), Europe 2	None	None	Barrisol
Toulouse	(France) Erick Mombaerts	Lotto	Nicopatch, Monné-Decroix, Sud Radio / Eaux d'Alet	None	None	None

== League table ==
Pos	Team	Pld	W	D	L	GF	GA	GD	Pts	Qualification or relegation
1	Lyon (C)	38	22	13	3	56	22	+34	79	Qualification to Champions League group stage
2	Lille	38	18	13	7	52	29	+23	67	Qualification to Champions League group stage
3	Monaco	38	15	18	5	52	35	+17	63	Qualification to Champions League third qualifying round
4	Rennes	38	15	10	13	49	42	+7	55	Qualification to UEFA Cup first round
5	Marseille	38	15	10	13	47	42	+5	55	Qualification to Intertoto Cup third round
6	Saint-Étienne	38	12	17	9	47	34	+13	53	Qualification to Intertoto Cup second round
7	Lens	38	13	13	12	45	39	+6	52	Qualification to Intertoto Cup second round
8	Auxerre	38	14	10	14	48	47	+1	52	Qualification to UEFA Cup first round (Note: Auxerre was qualified for the 2005–06 UEFA Cup as winners of the 2004–05 Coupe de France.)
9	Paris Saint-Germain	38	12	15	11	40	41	−1	51	
10	Sochaux	38	13	11	14	42	41	+1	50	
11	Strasbourg	38	12	12	14	42	43	−1	48	Qualification to UEFA Cup first round (Note: Strasbourg was qualified for the 2005–06 UEFA Cup as winners of the 2004–05 Coupe de la Ligue.)
12	Nice	38	10	16	12	38	45	−7	46	
13	Toulouse	38	12	10	16	36	43	−7	46	
14	Ajaccio	38	10	15	13	36	40	−4	45	
15	Bordeaux	38	8	20	10	37	41	−4	44	
16	Metz	38	10	14	14	33	45	−12	44	
17	Nantes	38	10	13	15	33	38	−5	43	
18	Caen (R)	38	10	12	16	36	60	−24	42	Relegation to Ligue 2
19	Bastia (R)	38	11	8	19	32	48	−16	41	Relegation to Ligue 2
20	Istres (R)	38	6	14	18	25	51	−26	32	Relegation to Ligue 2

Source: Ligue 1
Rules for classification: 1) points; 2) goal difference; 3) number of goals scored.
(C) Champions; (R) Relegated

== Results ==
Home \ Away	ACA	AUX	BAS	BOR	CAE	IST	RCL	LIL	OL	OM	MET	ASM	NAN	NIC	PSG	REN	STE	SOC	STR	TFC
Ajaccio		4–3	1–0	0–0	2–2	0–0	0–0	0–0	1–1	2–0	1–2	3–0	1–1	0–1	1–0	1–1	1–1	3–1	2–2	1–0
Auxerre	1–0		4–1	0–0	1–0	0–0	3–0	1–3	0–3	0–0	4–0	2–2	2–1	4–3	1–1	3–1	2–2	2–0	0–0	3–2
Bastia	1–0	1–0		1–4	2–0	2–0	3–1	3–1	1–1	0–1	1–0	0–2	0–0	2–0	1–2	1–1	0–3	1–1	2–1	2–1
Bordeaux	0–0	0–0	0–0		2–2	2–2	1–1	1–3	0–0	3–3	1–0	1–1	0–2	5–1	3–0	0–0	2–0	2–0	0–2	1–1
Caen	2–2	0–2	0–1	1–1		1–1	1–0	0–0	1–0	2–3	0–1	1–0	2–1	0–0	0–0	2–2	2–0	0–2	0–0	0–2
Istres	0–1	1–0	1–0	0–1	3–2		0–2	0–2	0–0	0–2	0–0	0–1	0–1	1–1	1–1	0–2	0–2	2–0	1–1	1–0
Lens	1–1	3–1	2–1	2–0	0–1	0–1		1–1	0–1	0–0	2–0	1–1	2–0	0–0	2–2	5–2	3–0	3–2	2–1	1–0
Lille	0–2	2–0	2–1	0–0	2–0	8–0	2–1		2–1	1–2	4–0	1–1	2–1	1–0	1–0	0–0	1–0	0–0	1–1	1–1
Lyon	2–1	2–1	0–0	5–1	4–0	2–1	1–0	1–0		1–1	2–0	0–0	2–0	0–0	0–1	2–1	3–2	1–1	1–0	4–0
Marseille	1–2	0–1	1–0	1–0	2–3	1–1	2–1	3–0	0–1		1–3	1–1	3–1	2–0	1–1	3–1	1–1	0–2	2–0	1–0
Metz	1–0	3–0	2–0	0–0	1–2	2–1	1–1	1–1	1–1	0–1		1–1	1–0	1–1	3–2	1–1	2–2	0–0	1–0	0–1
Monaco	2–2	0–0	5–2	1–1	5–2	2–1	2–0	2–0	1–1	2–1	0–0		2–1	3–4	2–0	2–0	1–1	1–3	3–1	2–1
Nantes	0–0	1–1	1–1	0–1	2–0	1–0	1–0	1–3	2–2	2–2	1–0	0–0		0–1	1–0	2–0	0–0	2–2	2–1	2–2
Nice	3–0	1–0	1–1	3–3	0–1	0–0	1–1	1–1	0–1	1–1	1–1	2–1	0–0		1–1	2–0	2–0	2–1	0–0	1–0
Paris SG	1–0	1–0	1–0	1–1	2–2	2–2	0–2	1–1	0–0	2–1	3–0	0–1	1–0	3–1		1–0	2–2	2–2	1–0	0–0
Rennes	2–0	1–0	1–0	2–0	1–1	3–1	3–1	0–1	1–2	1–0	3–1	0–0	1–0	4–1	2–1		2–2	3–0	4–0	1–1
Saint-Étienne	3–0	3–1	3–0	0–0	5–0	2–0	0–0	0–0	2–3	2–0	0–0	0–1	0–0	2–1	0–0	1–0		1–0	1–1	0–0
Sochaux	1–0	1–2	1–0	4–0	1–0	1–1	1–2	0–2	0–2	2–0	2–1	1–1	1–0	0–0	1–2	3–0	2–1		1–2	2–0
Strasbourg	1–0	3–1	2–0	1–0	5–0	1–1	2–2	1–2	0–1	1–0	3–1	0–0	0–2	3–1	3–1	1–0	1–1	0–0		1–4
Toulouse	3–1	1–2	1–0	1–0	2–3	2–1	0–0	1–0	0–2	1–3	1–1	0–0	2–1	1–0	2–1	0–2	0–2	0–0	2–0	

Source: Ligue 1
Legend: Blue = home team win; Yellow = draw; Red = away team win.

== Top goalscorers ==
Rank	Player	Club	Goals
1	(Switzerland) Alexander Frei	Rennes	20
2	(France) Mickaël Pagis	Strasbourg	15
3	(Portugal) Pauleta	Paris Saint-Germain	14
4	(Guinea) Pascal Feindouno	Saint-Étienne	13
4	(Brazil) Ilan	Sochaux	13
4	(Brazil) Juninho Pernambucano	Lyon	13
4	(France) Sébastien Mazure	Caen	13
4	(France) Matt Moussilou	Lille	13
9	(Senegal) Mamadou Niang	Strasbourg	12
9	(Nigeria) John Utaka	Lens	12

== Awards ==
=== Player of the month ===
Month	Player
August	(France) Franck Ribéry (FC Metz)
September	(France) Fabien Barthez (Olympique de Marseille)
October	(Ghana) Michael Essien (Olympique Lyonnais)
November	(France) Camel Meriem (AS Monaco)
January	(France) Peguy Luyindula (Olympique de Marseille)
February	(Brazil) Juninho Pernambucano (Olympique Lyonnais)
March	(Brazil) Juninho Pernambucano (Olympique Lyonnais)
April	(France) Matt Moussilou (Lille OSC)
May	(Senegal) Mamadou Niang (RC Strasbourg)

=== Annual ===
Award	Winner	Club	Ref.
Player of the Season	(Ghana) Michael Essien	Olympique Lyonnais	
Young Player of the Season	(France) Jérémy Toulalan	Nantes	
Goalkeeper of the Season	(France) Grégory Coupet	Olympique Lyonnais	
Goal of the Season	(France) Laurent Batlles	Olympique de Marseille	
Manager of the Season	(France) Paul Le Guen	Olympique Lyonnais	

Team of the Year
Goalkeeper	(France) Grégory Coupet (Lyon)			
Defenders	(Senegal) Habib Beye (Marseille)	(Brazil) Cris (Lyon)	(France) Gaël Givet (Monaco)	(France) Éric Abidal (Lyon)
Midfielders	(Ivory Coast) Bonaventure Kalou (Auxerre)	(Brazil) Juninho (Lyon)	(Ghana) Michael Essien (Lyon)	(France) Florent Malouda (Lyon)
Forwards	(France) Sylvain Wiltord (Lyon)	(Switzerland) Alexander Frei (Rennes)		

== Attendances ==
No.	Club	Average attendance	Change	Highest
1	Olympique de Marseille	52,996	2.3%	57,041
2	Olympique lyonnais	37,509	4.2%	40,352
3	Paris Saint-Germain FC	35,401	-8.8%	43,904
4	RC Lens	34,964	0.4%	40,281
5	FC Nantes	30,738	-0.2%	37,022
6	AS Saint-Étienne	29,875	36.1%	35,070
7	Girondins de Bordeaux	23,474	-0.6%	32,712
8	Toulouse FC	23,323	16.2%	35,767
9	Stade rennais	23,267	34.6%	29,164
10	SM Caen	19,806	56.8%	20,972
11	FC Metz	18,205	1.1%	25,908
12	RC Strasbourg	17,441	5.3%	26,631
13	FC Sochaux	15,686	-4.9%	19,931
14	LOSC	13,333	-11.7%	16,891
15	AS Monaco	11,775	13.3%	17,512
16	OGC Nice	11,521	-3.5%	15,755
17	AJ auxerroise	11,373	-11.9%	21,227
18	FC Istres	6,937	230.0%	13,614
19	SC Bastia	5,213	-13.1%	8,598
20	AC Ajaccio	3,047	-13.3%	4,707
