= Ulrich Le Pen =

French former professional footballer (born 1974)

Personal information
- Date of birth: 23 January 1974 (age 52)
- Place of birth: Auray, Brittany, France
- Height: 1.75 m (5 ft 9 in)
- Position: Midfielder

Senior career*
Years	Team	Apps	(Gls)
1990–1997	Stade Rennais	99	(1)
1997–1999	Laval	50	(14)
1999–2001	Lorient	75	(14)
2001–2003	Ipswich Town	1	(0)
2002–2003	→ Strasbourg (loan)	26	(3)
2003–2006	Strasbourg	79	(13)
2006–2009	Lorient	62	(6)
2009–2010	Laval	24	(1)
Total		416	(52)
- * Club domestic league appearances and goals

Ulrich Le Pen (born 23 January 1974) is a French former professional footballer who played as a midfielder. He spent most of his career in his native France apart from a short stint at Ipswich Town.

== Career ==
Born in Auray, Brittany, Le Pen began his professional career with Rennes where he spent six years. In 110 games, he scored once. Either a winger or central midfielder, he is renowned for his passing. He moved to Laval where he scored 14 goals in 50 games within two seasons. In 1999, he moved to Lorient where, in two seasons, he scored 14 times in 63 games, scoring every 4.5 games. He stayed with Lorient until November 2001.

Despite interest from Rangers, he was then transferred to Premier League side Ipswich Town for FRF 15 million (GBP 1.4 million). He only played once in the league against Bolton Wanderers, but got injured almost immediately, resulting in only 12 minutes of play for the club. He made one more appearance that season in the FA Cup and another the following season in the UEFA Cup, but he never played again in a league game for Ipswich; it is assumed that he and his family never really settled in England.

After that short taste of Premier League football, he returned to France and joined Strasbourg permanently in 2003 after a loan spell. He scored 16 times in 105 games and scored Strasbourg's first goal of the 2005–06 season with a free kick. While at Strasbourg, Le Pen played as a substitute as they won the 2005 Coupe de la Ligue Final. He left to join Lorient in 2006. On 25 June 2009, the 35-year-old winger left Lorient to sign for Laval.

== Later career ==
In November 2017, Le Pen revealed that he had begun coaching Laval's U9's.
