= Guillaume Lacour =

French footballer (born 1980)

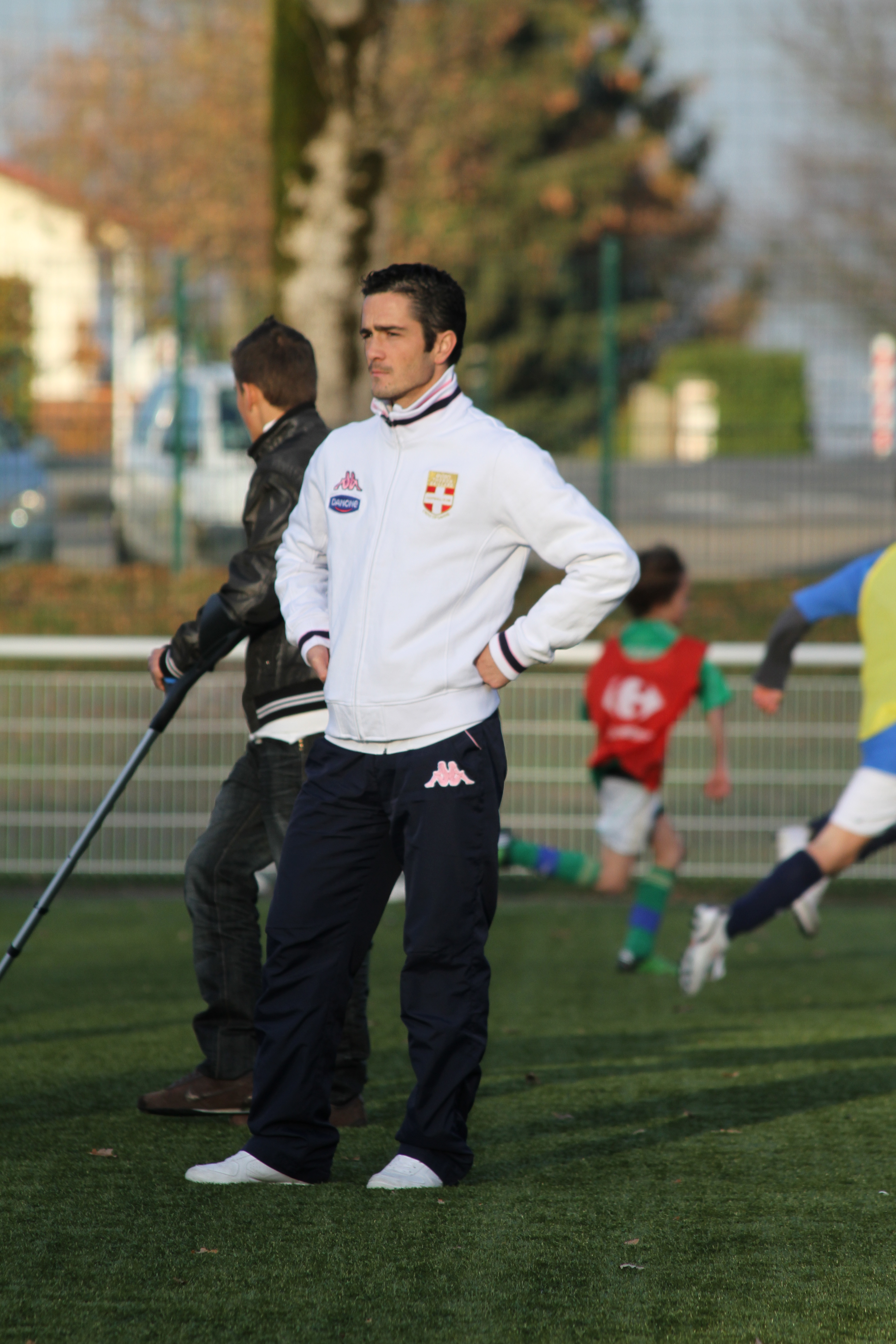
- Lacour in 2010

Personal information
- Date of birth: 2 August 1980 (age 46)
- Place of birth: Courbevoie, France
- Height: 1.73 m (5 ft 8 in)
- Position: Defensive midfielder

Youth career
- 2001–2002: Lyon

Senior career*
Years	Team	Apps	(Gls)
2002–2010	Strasbourg	243	(4)
2010–2013	Évian	51	(0)
2012	Évian B	1	(0)
2013–2016	Troyes	48	(0)
Total		343	(4)
- * Club domestic league appearances and goals

Guillaume Lacour (born 2 August 1980) is a French former professional footballer who played as a midfielder. He joined Évian from RC Strasbourg in July 2010, following an eight-year stint where he appeared in more than 200 league matches. While at Strasbourg Lacour played as they won the 2005 Coupe de la Ligue Final. Lacour finished his playing career with AS Troyes.
