= Alexandre Barbier =

French footballer (born 1979)

Personal information
- Date of birth: 7 July 1979 (age 47)
- Place of birth: Le Chesnay, France
- Height: 1.80 m (5 ft 11 in)
- Position: Defender

Senior career*
Years	Team	Apps	(Gls)
1999–2002	US Lusitanos Saint-Maur	36	(7)
2002–2003	US Créteil-Lusitanos	4	(0)
2003–2012	Stade Reims	229	(15)
- * Club domestic league appearances and goals

Alexandre Barbier (born 7 July 1979) is a French retired professional football player.

Barbier spent time at the INF Clairefontaine academy while playing for Paris-SG youth teams. He played on the professional level in Ligue 2 for Stade Reims.
