= 2005–06 Ligue 2 =

67th season of the second-tier football league in France

Ligue 2
- Season: 2005–06

The Ligue 2 season 2005–06, organised by the LFP was won by Valenciennes FC and saw the promotions of Valenciennes FC, CS Sedan Ardennes and FC Lorient, whereas AC Ajaccio, RC Strasbourg and FC Metz were relegated from Ligue 1.

== 20 participating teams ==
- Amiens
- Bastia
- Brest
- Caen
- Châteauroux
- Clermont
- Créteil
- Dijon
- Grenoble
- Gueugnon
- Guingamp
- Istres
- Laval
- Le Havre
- Lorient
- Montpellier
- Reims
- Sedan
- Sète
- Valenciennes

== League table ==
Pos	Team	Pld	W	D	L	GF	GA	GD	Pts	Promotion or Relegation
1	Valenciennes (C, P)	38	21	11	6	51	28	+23	74	Promotion to Ligue 1
2	Sedan (P)	38	19	14	5	50	32	+18	71	Promotion to Ligue 1
3	Lorient (P)	38	18	12	8	49	26	+23	66	Promotion to Ligue 1
4	Caen	38	18	12	8	56	35	+21	66	
5	Dijon	38	16	12	10	47	32	+15	60	
6	Bastia	38	16	10	12	47	40	+7	58	
7	Le Havre	38	13	16	9	48	41	+7	55	
8	Créteil	38	13	15	10	46	33	+13	54	
9	Guingamp	38	12	14	12	36	32	+4	50	
10	Grenoble	38	12	12	14	42	45	−3	48	
11	FC Gueugnon	38	11	15	12	29	37	−8	48	
12	Montpellier	38	12	11	15	34	43	−9	47	
13	Istres	38	12	11	15	33	45	−12	47	
14	Reims	38	10	15	13	32	31	+1	45	
15	Châteauroux	38	10	14	14	48	48	0	44	
16	Amiens	38	9	16	13	32	44	−12	43	
17	Brest	38	9	15	14	34	48	−14	42	
18	Clermont (R)	38	10	8	20	35	59	−24	38	Relegation to Championnat National [fr]
19	Laval (R)	38	9	8	21	38	59	−21	35	Relegation to Championnat National [fr]
20	Sète (R)	38	4	11	23	31	60	−29	23	Relegation to Championnat National [fr]

Source: Ligue 2
(C) Champions; (P) Promoted; (R) Relegated

== Results ==
Home \ Away	AMI	BAS	BRS	CAE	CHA	CLE	CRE	DIJ	GRE	GUE	GUI	IST	LAV	LHA	LOR	MHS	REI	SED	SÈT	VAL
Amiens		1–2	1–1	1–1	1–1	0–0	1–0	1–0	3–0	0–0	0–2	2–1	3–2	3–0	1–1	1–0	0–0	0–0	1–0	1–2
Bastia	2–0		4–1	0–2	1–4	4–0	1–1	0–2	2–0	2–0	1–2	3–0	3–0	1–1	1–1	0–0	0–1	1–1	1–0	1–0
Brest	0–1	0–2		2–1	1–0	2–0	0–2	0–4	3–1	0–0	2–1	0–0	2–2	2–2	0–1	0–1	1–1	4–1	1–1	1–1
Caen	3–0	4–1	3–1		2–1	2–1	3–1	1–1	1–1	1–0	0–0	1–0	2–1	4–1	1–0	0–0	1–3	1–1	1–0	0–2
Châteauroux	0–0	1–1	0–0	1–1		3–3	0–2	1–1	3–1	1–1	1–1	4–3	2–3	3–0	0–1	2–1	1–0	0–1	1–0	1–1
Clermont	2–0	2–0	0–1	0–3	0–2		2–0	3–3	1–0	0–1	3–2	1–0	1–0	2–2	0–3	0–1	0–0	1–0	0–0	1–2
Créteil	1–0	1–1	0–0	3–2	1–1	3–1		1–2	1–0	4–0	2–1	4–1	3–1	1–1	1–1	3–0	0–2	0–1	3–0	1–1
Dijon	2–1	0–2	1–2	0–2	2–1	1–1	1–1		0–0	3–0	1–2	2–0	1–0	1–2	0–0	2–2	2–0	0–1	3–0	2–0
Grenoble	3–0	5–1	1–1	0–2	2–1	2–0	1–0	1–2		3–0	0–0	0–0	2–1	1–1	1–0	2–2	1–0	1–3	0–0	2–3
Gueugnon	0–0	2–0	0–1	2–2	2–1	2–0	0–0	0–0	1–1		1–0	2–0	1–1	1–0	0–1	3–1	0–0	1–0	3–3	2–0
Guingamp	6–0	0–1	1–0	0–0	0–1	3–1	0–0	0–0	0–1	0–0		2–0	0–2	1–1	1–1	1–0	2–1	1–1	1–0	0–2
Istres	1–0	1–0	1–0	0–0	2–1	1–1	0–1	1–1	2–1	0–1	0–0		2–1	1–1	2–1	1–0	3–0	2–2	1–0	1–4
Laval	2–1	1–2	1–0	1–0	1–1	2–1	2–1	0–1	0–0	1–1	1–2	0–1		0–0	0–2	0–2	2–2	0–2	2–0	0–2
Le Havre	1–1	2–2	2–0	2–0	0–3	2–1	1–1	1–2	4–1	2–1	1–1	0–0	4–0		0–0	1–0	1–1	0–2	1–0	3–0
Lorient	1–1	1–0	5–0	1–3	2–1	0–2	0–0	1–0	1–2	2–0	2–1	1–1	2–1	0–0		3–0	3–1	0–0	3–1	1–1
Montpellier	2–1	1–1	1–1	1–3	2–1	1–0	0–0	2–0	1–1	3–1	0–0	3–1	1–2	2–1	0–3		0–0	0–1	2–1	0–0
Reims	0–0	0–1	1–0	2–0	3–0	4–1	1–0	0–1	0–0	0–0	0–0	0–0	3–1	0–2	1–2	0–1		1–2	2–0	0–0
Sedan	1–1	1–1	2–2	1–1	1–1	3–0	2–1	0–2	2–1	2–0	2–0	3–1	1–1	2–1	1–0	2–0	1–1		2–1	0–3
Sète	4–4	1–0	1–1	1–1	2–2	1–3	1–1	0–0	1–3	2–0	1–2	1–2	3–2	0–3	0–2	2–0	1–1	0–1		1–2
Valenciennes	0–0	0–1	1–1	2–1	2–0	3–0	1–1	2–1	2–0	0–0	2–0	1–0	2–1	0–1	1–0	2–1	1–0	1–1	2–1	

Source: Ligue 2
Legend: Blue = home team win; Yellow = draw; Red = away team win.

== Top goalscorers ==
Rank	Player	Club	Goals
1	(France) Jean-Michel Lesage	Le Havre	16
1	(France) Steve Savidan	Valenciennes	16
3	(Senegal) David Papys M'Bodji	Créteil	15
4	(Ivory Coast) Kandia Traoré	Le Havre	14
5	(France) Frédéric Fouret	Clermont	13
5	(France) Guilherme Mauricio	Laval	13
7	(France) Pierre-Yves André	Bastia	12
7	(Algeria) Nassim Akrour	Grenoble	12
7	(Algeria) Mansour Boutabout	Sedan	12
10	(France) Stéphane Samson	Caen	11

== Attendances ==
#	Club	Average
1	Caen	12,866
2	Sedan	11,465
3	Guingamp	9,348
4	Le Havre	8,790
5	Valenciennes	8,669
6	Lorient	8,652
7	Amiens	7,564
8	La Berrichonne	6,740
9	Brest	6,167
10	MHSC	5,892
11	Grenoble	5,509
12	Reims	5,127
13	Clermont	5,027
14	Dijon	4,780
15	Bastia	4,456
16	Laval	4,331
17	Gueugnon	4,103
18	Créteil	3,998
19	Istres	3,413
20	Sète	2,305
