= Guillaume Norbert =

French footballer (born 1980)

Personal information
- Full name: Guillaume Norbert
- Date of birth: 14 October 1980 (age 46)
- Place of birth: Châtenay-Malabry, France
- Height: 1.80 m (5 ft 11 in)
- Position: Midfielder

Youth career
- –1997: Paris Saint-Germain
- 1997–2001: Arsenal

Senior career*
Years	Team	Apps	(Gls)
2001–2004	Lorient	22	(0)
2002–2003	→ Créteil (loan)	28	(1)
2004–2005	Angers	16	(1)
2005–2008	Nantes	24	(1)
2008–2010	Le Havre	9	(0)

Managerial career
- 2018-: Racing Club de France
- * Club domestic league appearances and goals

Guillaume Norbert (born 14 October 1980) is a French professional football manager and former player who played as a midfielder. Norbert featured during his career for Lorient, Créteil, Angers, Nantes and Le Havre.

He is the head coach of Racing Club de France Football.

== Personal life ==
His brother, Ludwig, has also played professional football.

== Honours ==
=== Lorient ===
Coupe de France finalist: 2002
