= Romain Poyet =

French footballer (born 1980)

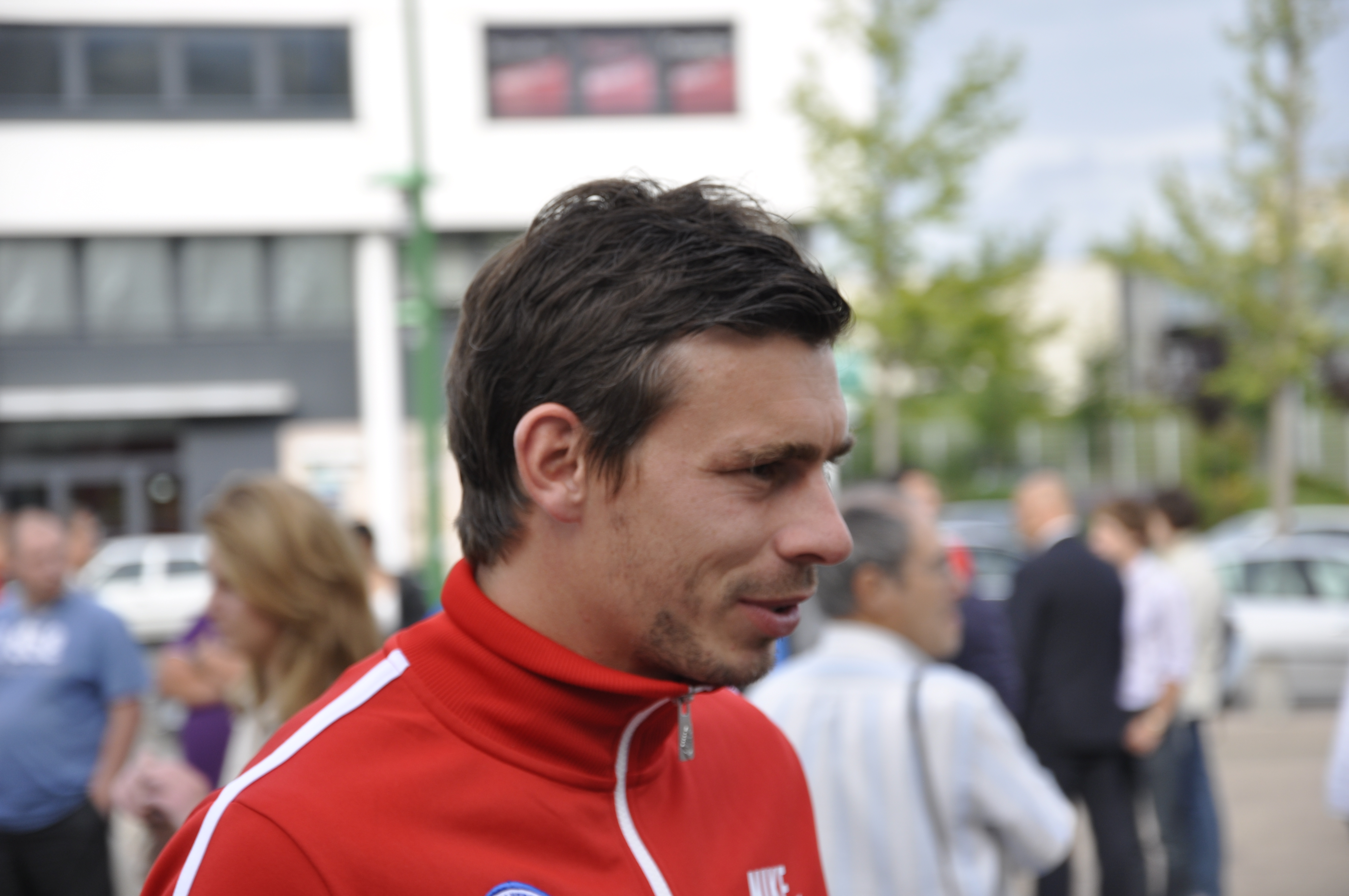
- Poyet in 2012

Personal information
- Date of birth: 25 November 1980 (age 45)
- Place of birth: Le Coteau, France
- Height: 1.84 m (6 ft 0 in)
- Position: Striker

Senior career*
Years	Team	Apps	(Gls)
2001–2002	Saint-Priest	29	(9)
2002–2003	Auxerre B	27	(3)
2003–2006	Auxerre	20	(0)
2004–2005	→ Clermont (loan)	37	(10)
2006–2007	Dijon	38	(3)
2008–2012	Brest	89	(13)
2012–2014	Stade Malherbe Caen	31	(4)
2014	→ Amiens (loan)	16	(5)
2014–2015	Amiens	32	(4)
Total		319	(51)
- * Club domestic league appearances and goals

Romain Poyet (born 25 November 1980) is a French former professional footballer who played as a striker.

== Career ==
Poyet signed his first contract in Roanne, before joining Saint Etienne, where he stayed only one year. After leaving Saint-Etienne, he moved to Roanne, and eventually joined Pomey. Showing fair progress, he was contacted by Saint Priest, which was playing at this point in the Championnat de France amateur.

During a French cup match, he was noticed by a scout of AJ Auxerre, who saw a lot of potential in him. Auxerre eventually signed him. During his first years at the club, he had only few opportunities to play with the first team. Auxerre was then competing in Ligue 1, far above the level at which Poyet was used to play. Moreover, Djibril Cissé, Auxerre's best player at his position, was performing very well. In 2005, he left for Clermont on loan. Returning to Auxerre for the 2005–06 season, he scored one goal, but was mostly disappointed by the coach's choices as he only seldom played. He joined Dijon in 2007 and was eventually sold to Brest on a three years contract, plus one optional season if the club would reach Ligue 1. Brest was indeed promoted at the end of the 2009–10 season. Poyet played two years in Ligue 1 with Brest, including a brief spell at the top of the league during the 2010–11 season. At the end of the 2011–2012 season, he joined Stade Malherbe Caen in Ligue 2.
