= Departmental Council of Haute-Corse =

Departmental government of Haute-Corse, France

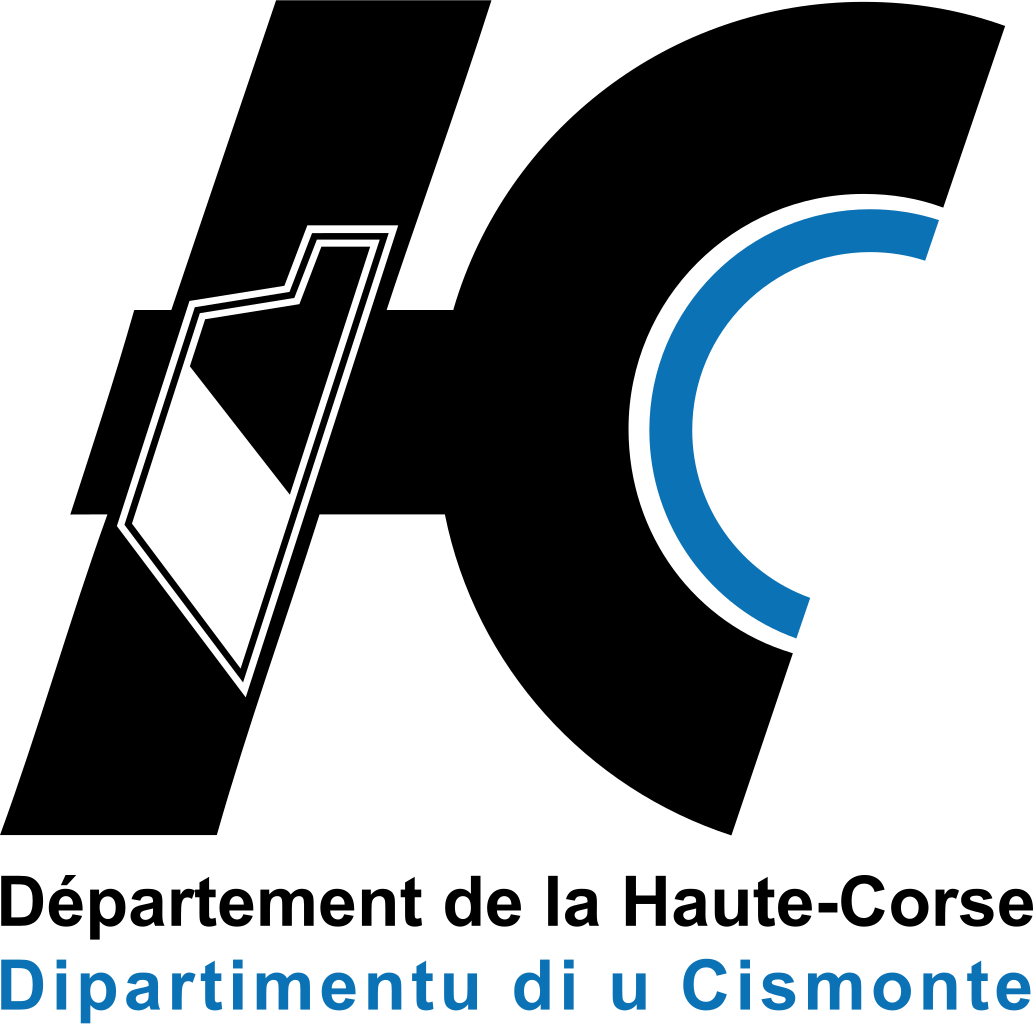
Logo of the Departmental Council

The Departmental Council of Haute-Corse (French: Conseil départemental de la Haute-Corse, Corsican: Cunsigliu dipartimentale di u Cismonte) was the deliberative assembly of the French department of Haute-Corse, a decentralized territorial collectivity from 1976 to 2017. Its headquarters were in Bastia. Following the territorial reform of 2015, the two departmental councils of Corsica (Haute-Corse and Corse-du-Sud) merged on January 1, 2018 with the Territorial Collectivity of Corsica, which already exercised the powers of a region with special status, to form the Collectivity of Corsica.

== Composition ==
=== The President ===
François Orlandi (PRG) was elected on January 20, 2015, following the resignation of Joseph Castelli announced on December 22, 2014.

=== Vice-presidents (as of 2015) ===
Order	Name	Party	Group
1st	Francis Giudici	DVD, Giacobbiste	Democrats
2nd	Antoinette Salducci	DVD	Progressive
3rd	Pierre Siméon de Buochberg	DVD	Corsican 21
4th	Catherine Cognetti-Turchini	DVG	Progressive
5th	Marc-Antoine Nicolaï	DVD	Democrats
6th	Élisabeth Santelli	DVD	Corsica Democrazia
7th	Yannick Castelli	PRG	Progressive
8th	Charlotte Terrighi	DVD	Progress Liberals
9th	Michel Simonpietri	DVG	Corsica Democrazia
