= Ludwig Norbert =

French footballer (born 1983)

Personal information
- Full name: Ludwig Norbert
- Date of birth: 19 November 1983 (age 43)
- Place of birth: Châtenay-Malabry, France
- Height: 1.88 m (6 ft 2 in)
- Position: Midfielder

Senior career*
Years	Team	Apps	(Gls)
2000–2001	Tottenham Hotspur	0	(0)
2001–2002	Lorient	0	(0)
2002	→ Rangers (loan)	0	(0)
2002–2003	Créteil	5	(1)
2003–2005	Angers	55	(5)
2005–2006	Châteauroux	1	(0)
2006–2008	CEP Lorient	?	(?)
- * Club domestic league appearances and goals

Ludwig Norbert (born 19 November 1983) is a French former professional footballer who played as a midfielder. His brother, Guillaume, also played professional football.

Norbert started his career with English club Tottenham Hotspur, but after failing to settle he left the club in 2001 without having made a senior appearance. He joined Ligue 1 team Lorient, but again failed to break into the starting line-up and was loaned out to Scottish side Rangers in April 2002. A permanent move to Créteil followed in the summer of 2002 and he played five matches and scored one goal during his sole season with the club. Norbert signed for Angers at the start of the 2003–04 season. (Note: Ludwig Norbert – French league stats at LFP – also available in French (archived)) He spent two years with Angers, making a total of 55 league appearances. Norbert later spent a season at Châteauroux, where he played one league game, before moving into amateur football with CEP Lorient.
