= Arnaud Lebrun =

French footballer (born 1973)

Personal information
- Date of birth: 27 September 1973 (age 53)
- Place of birth: Cambrai, France
- Height: 1.82 m (6 ft 0 in)
- Position: Defender

Senior career*
Years	Team	Apps	(Gls)
1996–1998	Valenciennes	60	(13)
1998–2005	Amiens	161	(7)
1999–2000	→ Valenciennes (loan)	31	(6)
2005–2007	Laval	17	(0)
2007–2008	Chamois Niortais	46	(0)
2008–2010	Dijon	46	(0)
2010–2011	MDA Chasselay	11	(0)
- * Club domestic league appearances and goals

Arnaud Lebrun (born 27 September 1973) is a French former professional footballer who played as a defender for clubs including Valenciennes, Amiens, Laval and Chamois Niortais.
