= Johan Gallon =

French footballer (born 1978)

Personal information
- Date of birth: 10 April 1978 (age 48)
- Place of birth: Caen, France
- Height: 1.85 m (6 ft 1 in)

Senior career*
Years	Team	Apps	(Gls)
1995–2000	Caen (B team)		
1997–2001	Caen	121	(13)
2002	Étoile Carouge FC	4	(0)
2002–2005	Clermont Foot	84	(6)
2005	→ Stade Brestois (loan)	12	(0)
2006	Racing Ferrol	13	(0)
2006–2009	Istres	15	(0)

Managerial career
- 2013–2021: Granville
- * Club domestic league appearances and goals

Johan Gallon (born 10 April 1978) is a French former football player. He was manager of US Granville from 2013 until 2021.
