= Lesly Malouda =

French Guianese footballer (born 1983)

Personal information
- Full name: Lesly Marguerite Malouda
- Date of birth: 16 November 1983 (age 42)
- Place of birth: Kourou, French Guiana
- Height: 1.72 m (5 ft 8 in)
- Position: Left-back

Youth career
- 1989–1998: ASC Le Geldar

Senior career*
Years	Team	Apps	(Gls)
1998–2004	Lens B	79	(2)
2004–2006	Lens	8	(0)
2005–2006	→ Istres (loan)	26	(2)
2006–2007	Lens B	0	(0)
2007–2008	Toulouse Fontaines Club	2	(0)
2008–2009	Atlético Baleares	19	(1)
2009–2014	Dijon	56	(0)
Total		190	(5)

International career
2012	French Guiana	6	(0)
- * Club domestic league appearances and goals

Lesly Marguerite Malouda (born 16 November 1983) is a French Guianan former professional footballer who played as a left-back.

== Club career ==
=== Youth ===
Born in Kourou, French Guiana, Malouda played football in his teenage years for the French Guiana club ASC Le Geldar and visited the Collége Henri Agrande in Kourou.

=== Senior ===
Malouda began his professional career with RC Lens being promoted to the Ligue 1 team in summer 2004. After eight games in his first season was loaned out by Lens and joined for Istres for the 2005–06 season playing 26 games scoring two goals. In August 2006, after his return to Lens, he was demoted to the reserves.

After one year with the B team, he left for Toulouse Fontaines Club in July 2007. After one year with the club he joined Atlético Baleares of Mallorca in August 2008. On 17 July 2009, Dijon signed Malouda on a free transfer. He remained with the club for five years but only made 56 appearances, including five matches during the 2011–12 season, when the club competed in Ligue 1. In January 2014, having not featured in any matches for the first team during the first half of the season (with the club now back in Ligue 2), the club announced that his contract had been terminated by mutual agreement.

== International career ==
Malouda made his international debut for French Guiana, his region of birth, on 6 September 2012 in a friendly against Suriname. He was part of French Guiana's squad for the 2012 Caribbean Championship.

== Personal life ==
Lesly is the brother of former Chelsea winger Florent Malouda.
