= Bertrand Fayolle =

French footballer (born 1975)

Personal information
- Date of birth: 15 August 1975 (age 51)
- Place of birth: Saint-Étienne, France
- Height: 1.83 m (6 ft 0 in)
- Position: Forward

Senior career*
Years	Team	Apps	(Gls)
1995–1998	L'Étrat		
1998–2000	Saint-Étienne	27	(5)
2000	Sion	13	(1)
2001	Clermont		
2001–2004	ASOA Valence	73	(19)
2004–2005	Nancy	30	(6)
2005–2007	Amiens	55	(4)
2007–2008	Gueugnon		
2009–2010	AS Valence		

Managerial career
- 2010–2012: AS Valence (assistant)
- * Club domestic league appearances and goals

Bertrand Fayolle (born 15 August 1975) is a French former professional footballer who played as a forward.

== After football ==
After retiring from football, Fayolle became the assistant manager of AS Valence from 2010 to 2012. Later, he went to work for Ford, while living in the region of Valence.

From 2015 to 2016, Fayolle worked as a coach in the U13 team of an amateur club in Saint-Christo-en-Jarez.

== Career statistics ==
Appearances and goals by club, season and competition
Club	Season	League			Cup (Note: Includes both Coupe de France and Coupe de la Ligue)		Total	
Club	Season	Division	Apps	Goals	Apps	Goals	Apps	Goals
Saint-Étienne	1998–99	Division 2	25	5	3	0	28	5
Saint-Étienne	1999–2000	Division 1	2	0	1	1	3	1
Saint-Étienne	Total		27	5	4	1	31	6
Sion	2000–01	Nationalliga A	13	1	0	0	13	1
ASOA Valence	2001–02	National	6	0	1	0	7	0
ASOA Valence	2002–03	Ligue 2	31	4	1	0	32	4
ASOA Valence	2003–04	Ligue 2	36	15	3	1	39	16
ASOA Valence	Total		73	19	5	1	78	20
Nancy	2004–05	Ligue 2	30	6	2	1	32	7
Amiens	2005–06	Ligue 2	22	1	3	1	25	2
Amiens	2006–07	Ligue 2	29	3	4	1	33	4
Amiens	2007–08	Ligue 2	4	0	0	0	4	0
Amiens	Total		55	4	7	2	62	6
Gueugnon	2007–08	Ligue 2	7	1	1	0	8	1
Career total			205	36	19	5	224	41

== Honours ==
Saint-Étienne

- French Division 2: 1998–99

Nancy

- Ligue 2: 2004–05
