= Chiguy Lucau =

Congolese-French footballer (born 1984)

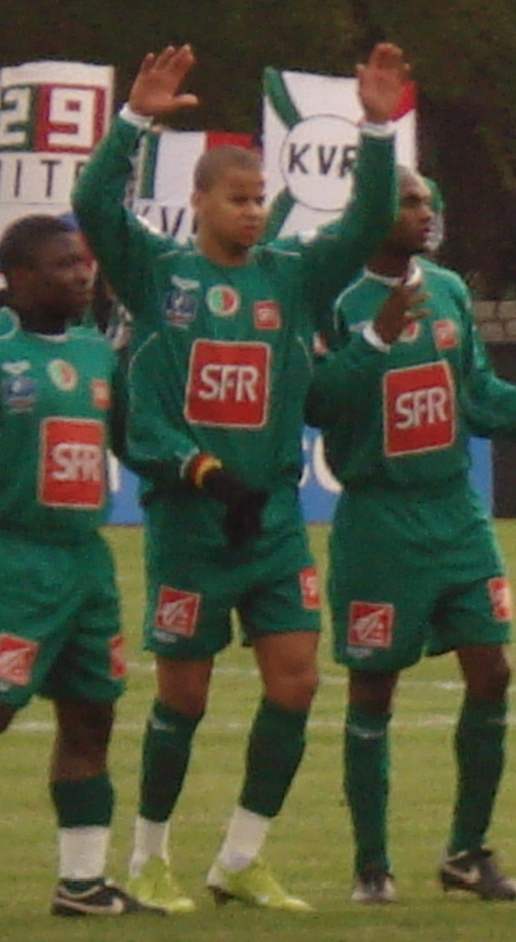
- Lucau (right) with Sedan in 2007

Personal information
- Date of birth: 4 August 1984 (age 42)
- Place of birth: Kinshasa, Zaire
- Height: 1.77 m (5 ft 10 in)
- Position: Forward

Youth career
- 1997–1999: Levallois
- 1999–2002: Paris Saint-Germain

Senior career*
Years	Team	Apps	(Gls)
2002–2004	Paris Saint-Germain	3	(0)
2004–2007	Le Mans	56	(11)
2007–2010	Sedan	39	(7)
2009	→ Châteauroux (loan)	4	(0)
2010–2011	Colmar	18	(6)
2011–2012	Créteil	5	(0)
2013–2014	Tarbes Pyrénées	17	(0)
2014	Royal Thai Police	0	(0)
Total		142	(24)

International career
- Congo DR
- * Club domestic league appearances and goals

Chiguy Lucau (born 4 August 1984 in Kinshasa) is a Congolese-French retired footballer who played as a forward.

== Career ==
He began his 1997 career with Levallois SC and joined in summer 1999 to PSG. In January 2003 was promoted to Paris Saint-Germain and played in his first professional season 3 games in the Ligue 1. After his first senior year with PSG left Lucau his club and signed for Le Mans. He played for Le Mans Union Club 72 64 games in the Ligue 1 and Ligue 2 before signed for CS Sedan Ardennes in summer 2007. Lucau joined than on 1 January 2009 on a six-month loan from his club CS Sedan to LB Châteauroux. He played in the second half of the 2008/2009 season only four games for LB Châteauroux in the Ligue 2 and returned to CS Sedan Ardennes. After his return played for his club CS Sedan Ardennes just 3 games and was in summer 2010 released from his club. On 28 October 2010 after three months as Free agent signed a one-year contract with SR Colmar.
