= Egon Gindorf =

German-born French entrepreneur (1930–2020)

- Born: 20 December 1930; Dillingen, Weimar Republic
- Died: 8 October 2020 (aged 89)
- Occupation: Entrepreneur

Egon Gindorf (20 December 1930 – 8 October 2020) was a German-born French entrepreneur. He notably served as President of RC Strasbourg Alsace from 2003 to 2005.

== Biography ==
Gindorf was the founder of Eurodirect, specializing in advice on direct marketing, which had 800 employees in 2004. At RC Strasbourg Alsace, he was a shareholder and served on the supervisory board of the club from 1990 to 1998. He began leading the club in 2003 following the exit of IMG and officially became President on 3 May of that year. Minority owner Patrick Adler said that without Gindorf, the club would no longer exist. Gindorf was highly appreciated by fans of the club during his leadership. He left Strasbourg for personal reasons in December 2005.

Egon Gindorf died on 8 October 2020 at the age of 89.
