= David Papys M'Bodji =

Senegalese footballer

Personal information
- Full name: David Amadou "Papys" M'Bodji
- Date of birth: July 13, 1984 (age 42)
- Place of birth: Kaolack, Senegal
- Height: 1.77 m (5 ft 9 1/2 in)
- Position: Centre forward

Senior career*
Years	Team	Apps	(Gls)
2002–2003	Marseille	2	(0)
2003–2004	Cannes	31	(5)
2004–2006	Créteil	61	(20)
2006–2008	Lorient	8	(0)
2007	→ Strasbourg (loan)	8	(1)
2008	→ Clermont Foot (loan)	10	(0)
2008–2009	AS Cannes	13	(0)
2009–2010	Créteil	20	(0)

International career
2006	Senegal	1	(0)
- * Club domestic league appearances and goals as of June 28, 2007

David Amadou "Papys" M'Bodji (born July 13, 1984) is a retired Senegalese footballer who played as a centre forward.
