= Malik Hebbar =

French footballer (born 1973)

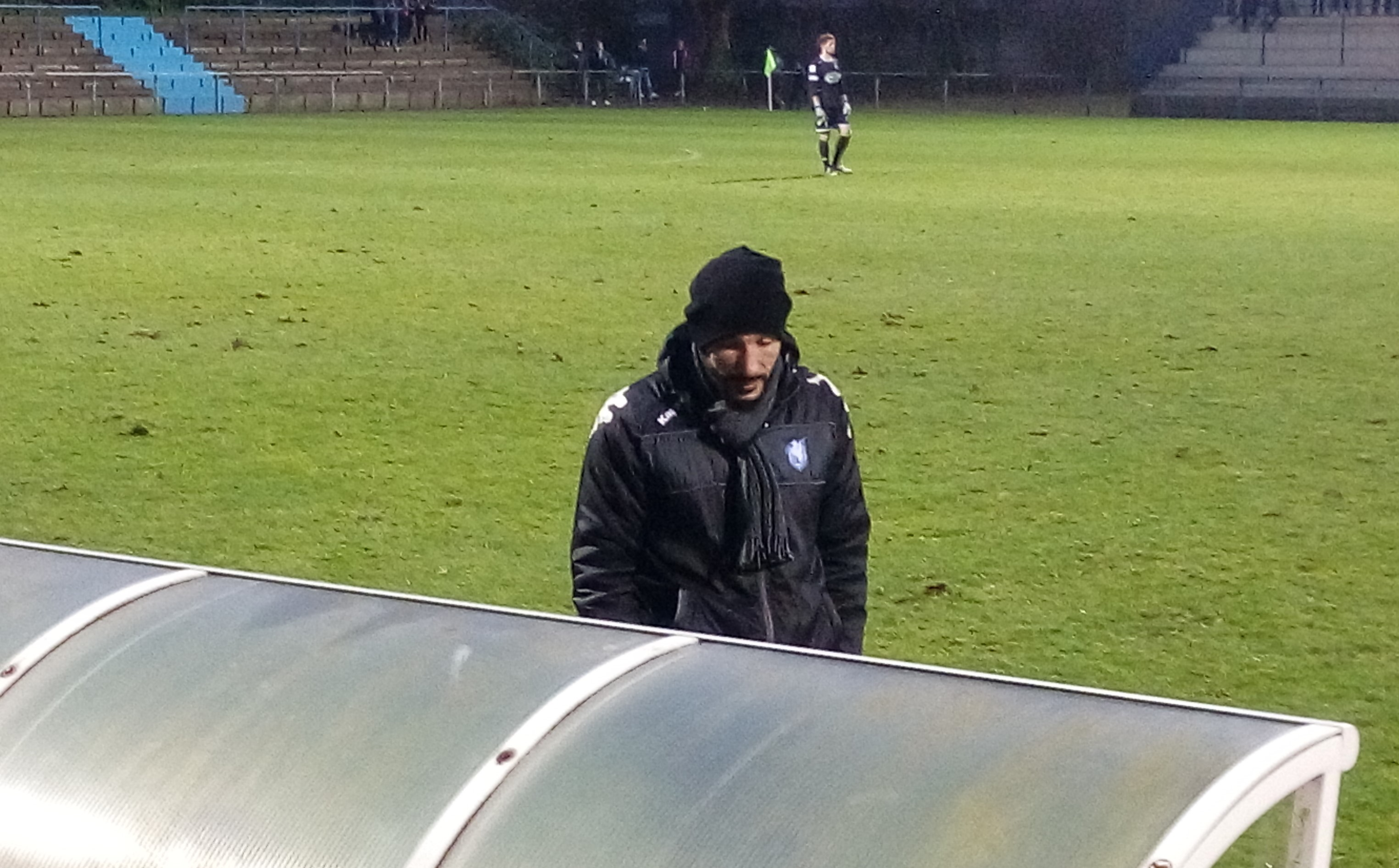
- Malik Hebbar during the match Lens B / Drancy, 2017

Personal information
- Full name: Abdelmalik Hebbar
- Date of birth: 6 October 1973 (age 53)
- Place of birth: Bondy, France
- Height: 1.78 m (5 ft 10 in)
- Position: Forward

Senior career*
Years	Team	Apps	(Gls)
1995–2001	Olympique Noisy-le-Sec	?	(?)
2001–2003	Istres	57	(7)
2003–2004	FC Gueugnon	32	(4)
2004–2006	Stade Reims	52	(2)
2006–2010	Drancy	?	(?)

Managerial career
- 2010–2019: Drancy
- * Club domestic league appearances and goals as of 18:03, 23 November 2009 (UTC)

Abdelmalik Hebbar, known as Malik Hebbar, (born 6 October 1973) is a former French professional football player of Algerian origin who was most recently coach of JA Drancy.

He played on the professional level for FC Istres, FC Gueugnon and Stade Reims in Ligue 2.
