= Stéphane Samson =

French footballer (born 1975)

Personal information
- Date of birth: 3 September 1975 (age 51)
- Place of birth: Bernay, France
- Height: 1.78 m (5 ft 10 in)
- Position: Striker

Youth career
- 1992–1995: Le Havre

Senior career*
| Years | Team | Apps | (Gls) |
| 1995–1999 | Le Havre | 70 | (9) |
| 1999–2002 | Le Mans | 96 | (34) |
| 2002–2005 | Clermont Foot | 84 | (18) |
| 2005–2008 | Caen | 77 | (24) |
| 2008–2009 | Reims | 4 | (0) |
| Total | | 331 | (85) |
- * Club domestic league appearances and goals

Stéphane Samson (born 3 September 1975) is a French former professional football who played as a striker.
