= Anthony Deroin =

French professional footballer (born 1979)

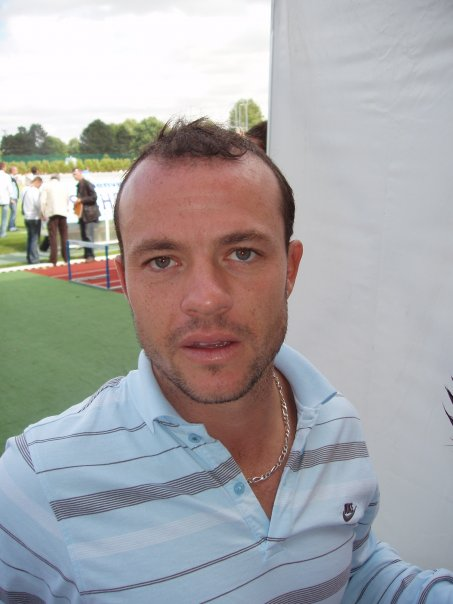
- Deroin in 2008

Personal information
- Full name: Anthony Nicolas Michel Deroin
- Date of birth: 15 March 1979 (age 47)
- Place of birth: Caen, France
- Height: 1.63 m (5 ft 4 in)
- Position: Midfielder

Youth career
- 1993–1997: SM Caen

Senior career*
Years	Team	Apps	(Gls)
1997–2012	SM Caen	368	(35)
Total		368	(35)
- * Club domestic league appearances and goals

Anthony Nicolas Michel Deroin (born 15 March 1979) is a French former professional footballer who played his entire career for Stade Malherbe Caen as a midfielder.

== Career ==
Deroin spent his whole career with Stade Malherbe Caen, from 1997 to 2012, scoring 35 goals in 368 appearances (9 goals in 102 in Ligue 1). He was promoted in French Ligue 1 with his club in 2004, 2007 and 2010.

In 2008, he surpassed Yvan Lebourgeois's record of 320 appearances for Caen. Nicolas Seube since broke the record and became the club's all-time leader in appearances.

== See also ==
- List of one-club men
