= Aziz Ben Askar =

Footballer (born 1976)

Personal information
- Date of birth: 30 March 1976 (age 50)
- Place of birth: Château-Gontier, France
- Height: 1.87 m (6 ft 2 in)
- Position: Defender

Youth career
- Sablé
- Laval

Senior career*
Years	Team	Apps	(Gls)
1994–2003	Laval	140	(4)
2001–2002	→ Queens Park Rangers (loan)	18	(0)
2003–2006	Caen	76	(5)
2006–2007	→ Al-Shamal (loan)	9	(0)
2007–2010	Umm-Salal	44	(1)
2010–2011	Al-Wakrah	6	(0)
Total		293	(10)

International career
2006–2007	Morocco	14	(0)

Managerial career
- 2014–2015: Stade Mayennais (U17)
- 2015–2016: AS Bourny Laval
- 2018–2019: Ajaccio (U19)
- 2019–2021: Umm-Salal
- 2024: Wydad AC
- * Club domestic league appearances and goals

Aziz Ben Askar (born 30 March 1976) is a football manager and former player.

A defender, Ben Askar played for Laval and Stade Malherbe Caen in France, Queens Park Rangers F.C. in England, and for Al-Shamal Sports Club, Umm Salal Sport Club, and Al-Wakrah Sport Club in Qatar. Born in France, at international level he represented the Morocco national team.

== Coaching career ==
After retiring, Ben Askar started working as a football agent. However, he stopped as an agent because he missed being on the pitch and instead started working toward his coaching license.

Ben Askar started his coaching career with the U17 team of Stade Mayennais. In mid-2015, Ben Askar also began working for UNFP FC (Union Nationale des Footballeurs) as well as being appointed manager of AS Bourny Laval, which also was a part of the process to get his license. In May 2016 he announced that he would not continue at Bourny because he wanted to try something new with more adrenaline. Ben Askar also left UNFP in 2017.

In the summer 2018, Ben Askar had several offers but preferred to stay in France. He was then appointed manager of AC Ajaccio's U19 team. In November 2019, he was appointed manager of his former club, Umm Salal SC, in Qatar.

In April 2024, Ben Askar was appointed manager of Moroccan side Wydad AC.
