= Jean-Christophe Devaux =

French footballer (born 1975)

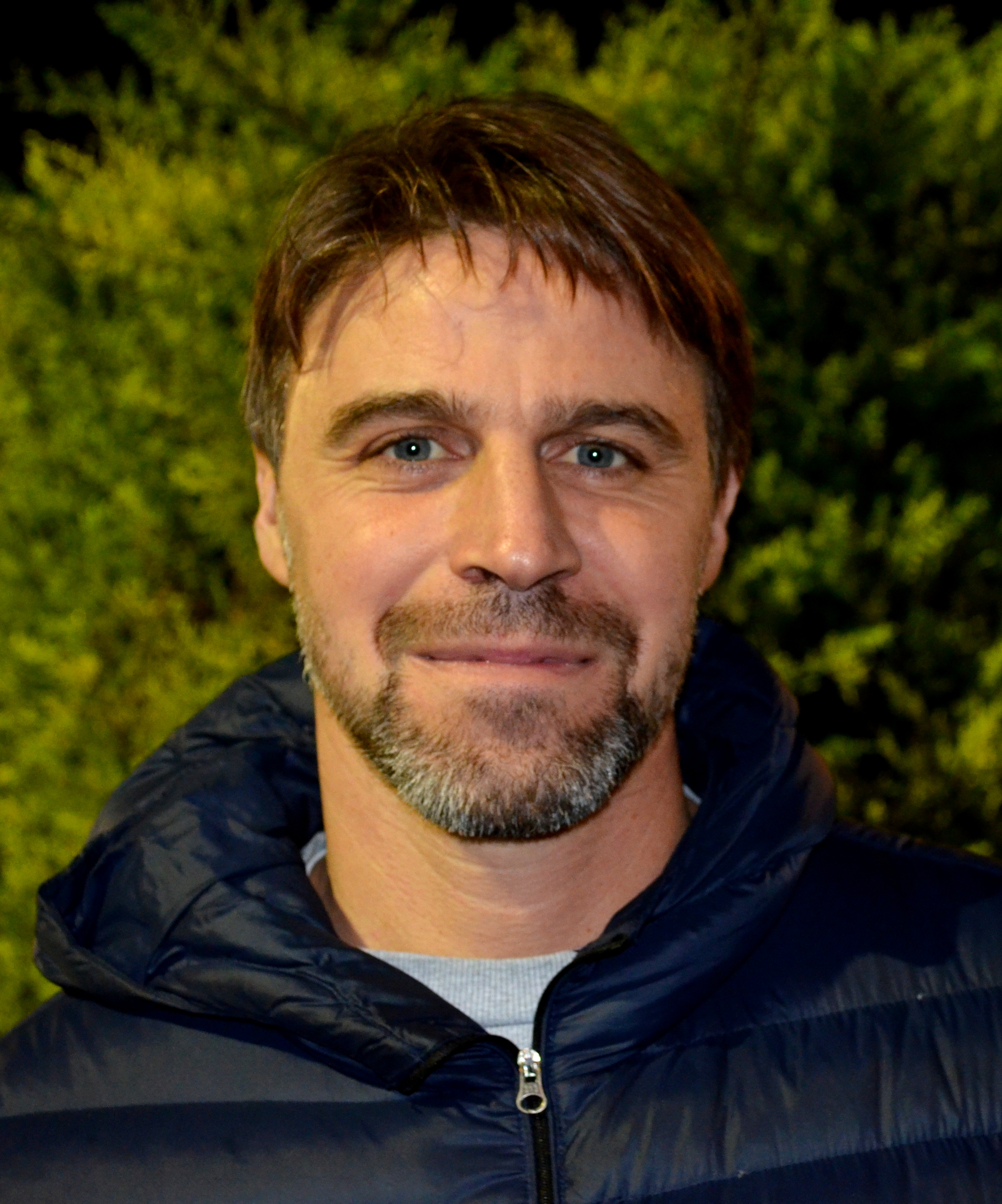
- Devaux in 2014

Personal information
- Date of birth: 16 May 1975 (age 51)
- Place of birth: Lyon, France
- Height: 1.83 m (6 ft 0 in)
- Position: Defender

Senior career*
Years	Team	Apps	(Gls)
1994–2000	Lyon	40	(0)
2000	Servette	11	(0)
2000–2007	Strasbourg	159	(2)
2007–2009	Reims	19	(0)
2009–2012	Ain Sud		
Total		229+	(2+)

Managerial career
- 2010–2013: Ain Sud
- 2013–2014: Lyon-Duchère
- * Club domestic league appearances and goals

Jean-Christophe Devaux (born 16 May 1975) is a French former professional footballer who played as a defender. In his career, he played for Lyon, Servette, Strasbourg, and Reims. He scored the winning goal for Strasbourg with a free-kick in the 2005 Coupe de la Ligue Final against Caen.
