= Sébastien Mazure =

French footballer (born 1979)

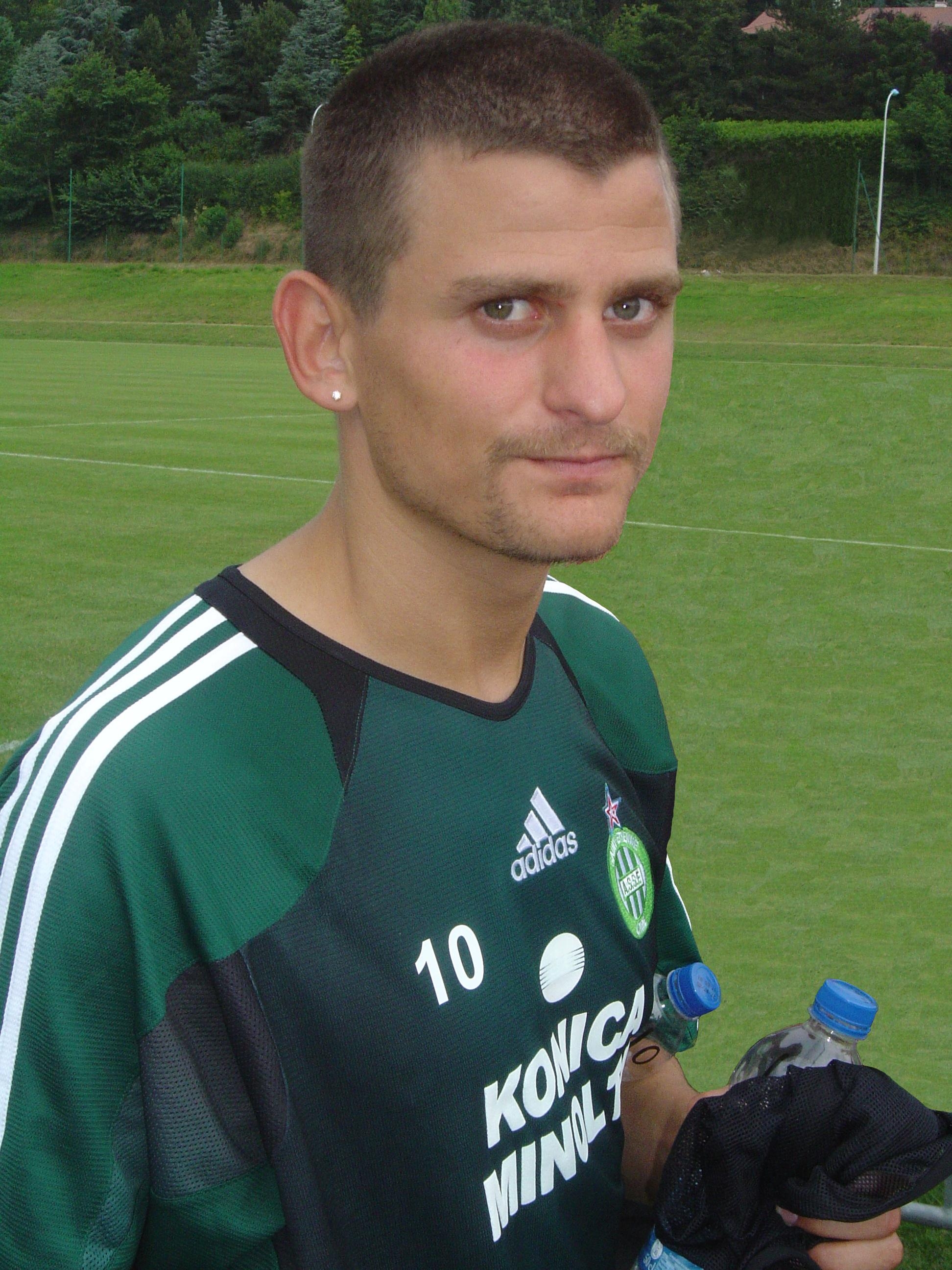
- Mazure in the 2005–06 season

Personal information
- Date of birth: 20 March 1979 (age 47)
- Place of birth: Paris, France
- Height: 1.81 m (5 ft 11 in)
- Position: Striker

Senior career*
Years	Team	Apps	(Gls)
2000–2001	Le Havre	16	(1)
2001–2005	Caen	103	(39)
2005–2006	Saint-Étienne	25	(2)
2006–2010	Caen	32	(4)
Total		176	(46)

Managerial career
- 2012-2018: RSG Courseulles
- 2018-2022: FC Baie de l'Orne
- 2022-2024: Bayeux Football Club
- 2026: US Blainville Biéville-Beuville
- * Club domestic league appearances and goals

Sébastien Mazure (born 20 March 1979, in Paris) is a French footballer who played as a striker.

AFter retiring from playing, he went into management, coaching local regional sides including Bayeux Football Club.
