= 2002–03 Toulouse FC season =

Toulouse
2002–03 season
- President: Olivier Sadran
- Head coach: Erick Mombaerts
- Stadium: Stadium de Toulouse
- Ligue 2: 1st (promoted)
- Coupe de France: Round of 16
- Coupe de la Ligue: First round
- Top goalscorer: League: Cédric Fauré (20); All: Cédric Fauré (20)
- Highest home attendance: 22,266 vs Istres
- Lowest home attendance: 5,338 vs Wasquehal
- Average home league attendance: 10,232
- Biggest win: Istres 0–4 Toulouse
- Biggest defeat: Schiltigheim 3–0 Toulouse

The 2002–03 season marked the 33rd year of Toulouse FC and its first season back in the second division of French football. In addition to competing in the domestic league, Toulouse participated in the Coupe de France and the Coupe de la Ligue.

== Players ==
=== First-team squad ===
Note: Flags indicate national team as defined under FIFA eligibility rules; some limited exceptions apply. Players may hold more than one non-FIFA nationality.

No.	Pos.	Nation	Player
1	GK	FRA	Christophe Revault
3	DF	FRA	William Prunier (captain)
4	DF	FRA	Mathieu Puig
6	MF	FRA	Julien Cardy
7	DF	FRA	Stéphane Lièvre
8	MF	FRA	Thibault Giresse
9	FW	FRA	Anthony Bancarel
10	MF	FRA	Nabil Taïder
11	MF	FRA	Sylvain Didot
12	DF	FRA	Lucien Aubey
13	DF	CIV	Issoumaila Dao
14	MF	FRA	Ulrick Chavas

No.	Pos.	Nation	Player
15	MF	FRA	Christophe Avezac
16	GK	FRA	Jérémie Moreau
17	MF	FRA	Anthony Braizat
17	DF	TOG	Alaixys Romao
19	MF	SEN	Ousmane N'Doye
20	MF	CMR	Achille Emaná
21	DF	FRA	Othmane Hamama
22	DF	FRA	Aurélien Mazel
23	MF	ALG	Nasser Hakkar
24	FW	FRA	Cédric Fauré
28	DF	FRA	Albin Ebondo
31	FW	FRA	Jérémy Blayac

== Transfers ==
=== In ===
No.	Pos	Player	Transferred to	Fee	Date	Source
–	MF	(France) Christophe Avezac	(France) Dijon	Free	1 July 2002	
–	MF	(France) Anthony Braizat	(France) Lyon	Free	1 July 2002	
–	MF	(France) Sylvain Didot	(France) Brest	Free	1 July 2002	
–	MF	(Senegal) Ousmane N'Doye	(Senegal) ASC Jeanne d'Arc	Undisclosed	1 July 2002	

=== Out ===
No.	Pos	Player	Transferred to	Fee	Date	Source
–	DF	(France) Olivier Candelon	(France) Baziège Olympique Club	Free	1 July 2002	
–	MF	(France) Sébastien Macé	Retired		1 July 2002	
–	MF	(France) Julien Stéphan	(France) Strasbourg	Undisclosed	1 July 2002	
–	FW	(France) Wilfried Niflore	(France) Cannes	Undisclosed	1 January 2003	

== Competitions ==
Win Draw Loss

=== Overall record ===
Competition	First match	Last match	Starting round	Final position	Record							
Competition	First match	Last match	Starting round	Final position	Pld	W	D	L	GF	GA	GD	Win %
Ligue 2	3 August 2002	23 May 2003	Matchday 1	Winners	38	21	9	8	50	24	+26	55.26
Coupe de France	23 November 2002	15 February 2003	Seventh round	Round of 16	5	3	1	1	7	6	+1	60.00
Coupe de la Ligue	11 October 2002		First round	First round	1	0	0	1	2	3	−1	0.00
Total					44	24	10	10	59	33	+26	54.55

Source: Competitions

=== Ligue 2 ===
==== League table ====
Pos	Team	Pld	W	D	L	GF	GA	GD	Pts	Promotion or Relegation
1	Toulouse (C, P)	38	21	9	8	50	24	+26	72	Promotion to Ligue 1
2	Le Mans (P)	38	18	14	6	49	33	+16	68	Promotion to Ligue 1
3	Metz (P)	38	19	10	9	52	29	+23	67	Promotion to Ligue 1
4	Lorient	38	18	11	9	43	29	+14	65	
5	Châteauroux	38	16	12	10	40	35	+5	60	

Source: Ligue 2
(C) Champions; (P) Promoted

==== Results summary ====
Overall								Home						Away					
Pld	W	D	L	GF	GA	GD	Pts	W	D	L	GF	GA	GD	W	D	L	GF	GA	GD
38	21	9	8	50	24	+26	72	15	2	2	32	8	+24	6	7	6	18	16	+2

Source: Ligue 1

==== Results by round ====
Round	1	2	3	4	5	6	7	8	9	10	11	12	13	14	15	16	17	18	19	20	21	22	23	24	25	26	27	28	29	30	31	32	33	34	35	36	37	38
Ground	A	A	H	A	H	A	H	A	H	A	H	A	H	A	H	A	H	A	H	H	A	H	A	H	A	H	A	H	A	H	A	H	A	H	A	H	A	H
Result	W	L	W	L	W	L	W	D	W	W	D	L	W	D	W	D	L	W	W	W	D	W	W	W	L	W	D	W	D	D	D	W	W	W	L	L	W	W
Position	1	9	6	8	3	7	3	5	2	2	2	3	2	3	2	2	2	2	2	2	2	2	1	1	1	1	1	1	1	1	1	1	1	1	1	1	1	1

Source: Ligue 2
A = Away; H = Home; W = Win; D = Draw; L = Loss

==== Matches ====
3 August 2002 1	Istres	0–4	Toulouse	Istres
20:00 CEST (UTC+2)		Report	Fauré 13', 56'; Giresse 16'; Braizat 89'	Stadium: Stade Bernard Bardin; Attendance: 1,168; Referee: Patrick Lhermite

11 August 2002 2	Lorient	1–0	Toulouse	Lorient
18:30 CEST (UTC+2)	Loko 82'	Report		Stadium: Stade du Moustoir; Attendance: 9,441; Referee: Dominique Fraise

17 August 2002 3	Toulouse	3–0	Metz	Toulouse
17:30 CEST (UTC+2)	Braizat 43'; Fauré 76'; Taïder 84'	Report		Stadium: Stadium de Toulouse; Attendance: 7,844; Referee: Pascal Vileo

24 August 2002 4	Le Mans	2–1	Toulouse	Le Mans
20:00 CEST (UTC+2)	Peyrelade 10'; Cousin 31'	Report	Braizat 24'	Stadium: Stade Léon-Bollée; Attendance: 7,924; Referee: Tony Chapron

31 August 2002 5	Toulouse	2–0	Caen	Toulouse
17:30 CEST (UTC+2)	Braizat 36', 46'	Report		Stadium: Stadium de Toulouse; Attendance: 8,495; Referee: Jean-Marc Rodolphe

4 September 2002 6	Niort	2–0	Toulouse	Niort
20:00 CEST (UTC+2)	Barro 55'; Biakolo 83'	Report		Stadium: Stade René Gaillard; Attendance: 3,427; Referee: Jean-Marc bonnin

11 September 2002 7	Toulouse	1–0	Saint-Étienne	Toulouse
20:00 CEST (UTC+2)	Braizat 50'	Report		Stadium: Stadium de Toulouse; Attendance: 9,223; Referee: Fredy Fautrel

14 September 2002 8	Beauvais	0–0	Toulouse	Beauvais
20:00 CEST (UTC+2)		Report		Stadium: Stade Pierre Brisson; Attendance: 4,045; Referee: Patrick Lhermite

20 September 2002 9	Toulouse	1–0	Wasquehal	Toulouse
16:30 CEST (UTC+2)	N'Doye 10'	Report		Stadium: Stadium de Toulouse; Attendance: 5,338; Referee: Jean-Charles Cailleux

28 September 2002 10	Valence	0–1	Toulouse	Valence
20:00 CEST (UTC+2)		Report	Emaná 54'	Stadium: Stade Georges Pompidou; Attendance: 4,507; Referee: Stéphane Bré

5 October 2002 11	Toulouse	0–0	Créteil	Toulouse
20:00 CEST (UTC+2)		Report		Stadium: Stadium de Toulouse; Attendance: 11,937; Referee: Stéphane Djouzi

19 October 2002 12	Nancy	3–2	Toulouse	Nancy
20:00 CEST (UTC+2)	Curbelo 15', 23'; Nicaise 42'	Report	Giresse 37', 89'	Attendance: 4,697; Referee: Bruno Derrien

27 October 2002 13	Toulouse	1–0	Châteauroux	Toulouse
18:15 CET (UTC+1)	Bancarel 61'	Report		Stadium: Stadium de Toulouse; Attendance: 10,451; Referee: Stéphane Lannoy

2 November 2002 14	Laval	1–1	Toulouse	Laval
20:00 CET (UTC+1)	Coulibaly 59'	Report	Fauré 43'	Stadium: Stade Francis Le Basser; Attendance: 3,476; Referee: Jean-Charles Cailleux

9 November 2002 15	Toulouse	2–1	Clermont	Toulouse
20:00 CET (UTC+1)	Giresse 42'; N'Doye 56'	Report	Deniaud 14'	Stadium: Stadium de Toulouse; Attendance: 5,893; Referee: Dominique Fraise

16 November 2002 16	Grenoble	1–1	Toulouse	Grenoble
20:00 CET (UTC+1)	Dissa 87'	Report	N'Doye 65'	Stadium: Stade des Alpes; Attendance: 5,247; Referee: Yves Brizou

30 November 2002 17	Toulouse	1–2	Amiens	Toulouse
20:00 CET (UTC+1)	Giresse 3' (pen.)	Report	Rivière 52', 58'	Stadium: Stadium de Toulouse; Attendance: 7,694; Referee: Alexandre Castro

4 December 2002 18	Gueugnon	0–1	Toulouse	Gueugnon
20:30 CET (UTC+1)		Report	Fauré 44'	Stadium: Stade Jean Laville; Attendance: 2,820; Referee: Serge Fidri

19 December 2002 19	Toulouse	2–0	Reims	Toulouse
20:30 CET (UTC+1)	Fauré 50'; Bancarel 89'	Report		Stadium: Stadium de Toulouse; Attendance: 7,150; Referee: Franck Glochon

11 January 2003 20	Toulouse	3–1	Lorient	Toulouse
20:00 CET (UTC+1)	Fauré 58', 61', 89'	Report	Kroupi 7'	Stadium: Stadium de Toulouse; Attendance: 7,683; Referee: Bruno Coué

16 January 2003 21	Metz	0–0	Toulouse	Metz
20:30 CET (UTC+1)		Report		Stadium: Stade Saint-Symphorien; Attendance: 9,807; Referee: Stéphane Moulin

21 January 2003 22	Toulouse	2–0	Le Mans	Toulouse
19:00 CET (UTC+1)	Fauré 51', 81' (pen.)	Report		Stadium: Stadium de Toulouse; Attendance: 11,633; Referee: Bertrand Layec

30 January 2003 23	Caen	0–2	Toulouse	Caen
20:00 CET (UTC+1)		Report	Fauré 25'; Hamama 90'	Stadium: Stade Michel d'Ornano; Attendance: 8,478; Referee: Dominique Fraise

2 February 2003 24	Toulouse	4–1	Niort	Toulouse
17:00 CET (UTC+1)	Fauré 24', 77'; Braizat 53'; Avezac 70'	Report	Gagnier 61'	Stadium: Stadium de Toulouse; Attendance: 10,484; Referee: Serge Fidri

9 February 2003 26	Toulouse	2–0	Beauvais	Toulouse
16:00 CET (UTC+1)	Prunier 47'; Dieuze 89'	Report		Stadium: Stadium de Toulouse; Attendance: 10,527; Referee: Yves Brizou

22 February 2003 27	Wasquehal	0–0	Toulouse	Wasquehal
20:00 CET (UTC+1)		Report		Stadium: Complexe sportif Lucien Montagne; Attendance: 1,541; Referee: Gilles Chéron

1 March 2003 28	Toulouse	3–1	Valence	Toulouse
20:00 CET (UTC+1)	Emaná 37'; Fabra 56' (o.g.); Fauré 81'	Report	Moreira 44'	Stadium: Stadium de Toulouse; Attendance: 7,769; Referee: Philippe Malige

7 March 2003 29	Créteil	2–2	Toulouse	Créteil
19:30 CET (UTC+1)	Buengo 42'; Frapolli 66'	Report	Fauré 18'; Avezac 44'	Stadium: Stade Dominique Duvauchelle; Attendance: 2,405; Referee: Laurent Duhamel

22 March 2003 30	Toulouse	0–0	Nancy	Toulouse
20:00 CET (UTC+1)		Report		Stadium: Stadium de Toulouse; Attendance: 9,098; Referee: Franck Glochon

27 March 2003 31	Châteauroux	0–0	Toulouse	Châteauroux
19:15 CET (UTC+1)		Report		Stadium: Stade Gaston-Petit; Attendance: 9,183; Referee: Philippe Chat

4 April 2003 32	Toulouse	2–1	Laval	Toulouse
20:00 CEST (UTC+2)	Fauré 2', 69' (pen.)	Report	Čustović 29'	Stadium: Stadium de Toulouse; Attendance: 8,414; Referee: Gilles Chéron

12 April 2003 33	Clermont	0–1	Toulouse	Clermont-Ferrand
20:00 CEST (UTC+2)		Report	Fauré 82'	Stadium: Stade Gabriel Montpied; Attendance: 9,405; Referee: Alexandre Castro

18 April 2003 34	Toulouse	2–0	Grenoble	Toulouse
20:00 CEST (UTC+2)	Fauré 6'; Emaná 65'	Report		Stadium: Stadium de Toulouse; Attendance: 10,016; Referee: Stéphane Bré

24 April 2003 25	Saint-Étienne	1–0	Toulouse	Saint-Étienne
19:30 CEST (UTC+2)	Alex 86'	Report		Stadium: Stade Geoffroy-Guichard; Attendance: 14,240; Referee: Philippe Kalt

3 May 2003 35	Amiens	3–1	Toulouse	Amiens
20:00 CEST (UTC+2)	Rivière 29', 64'; Abalo 32'	Report	Braizat 79'	Stadium: Stade de la Licorne; Attendance: 9,635; Referee: Philippe Malige

9 May 2003 36	Toulouse	0–1	Gueugnon	Toulouse
20:00 CEST (UTC+2)		Report	Neumann 90'	Stadium: Stadium de Toulouse; Attendance: 19,058; Referee: Hervé Piccirillo

16 May 2003 37	Reims	0–1	Toulouse	Reims
20:00 CEST (UTC+2)		Report	Didot 75'	Stadium: Stade Auguste-Delaune; Attendance: 7,318; Referee: Bertrand Layec

23 May 2003 38	Toulouse	1–0	Istres	Toulouse
20:30 CEST (UTC+2)	Giresse 53'	Report		Stadium: Stadium de Toulouse; Attendance: 22,266; Referee: Dominique Fraise

=== Coupe de France ===
24 November 2002 Seventh round	Béziers MFC	1–2	Toulouse	Béziers
--:-- CET (UTC+1)	Rodriguez 44'		Avezac 14'; Giresse 19'	Stadium: Stade de Sauclières; Attendance: 2,500; Referee: Didier Falcone

14 December 2002 Eighth round	FC Marmande	1–1 (a.e.t.) (3–4 p)	Toulouse	Marmande
--:-- CET (UTC+1)	Mokili Yenga 13'		Braizat 24'	Stadium: Stade de Michelon; Attendance: 2,000; Referee: Philippe Malige

4 January 2003 Round of 64	Toulouse	3–1	ES Viry-Châtillon	Toulouse
16:00 CET (UTC+1)	Avezac 5', 44'; Bancarel 73'		Perrin 56'	Stadium: Stadium de Toulouse; Attendance: 2,331; Referee: Saïd Ennjimi

25 January 2003 Round of 32	Toulouse	1–0	Lens	Toulouse
14:30 CET (UTC+1)	N'Doye (penalty missed) 13'; Bancarel 23'			Stadium: Stadium de Toulouse; Attendance: 21,526; Referee: Gilles Veissière

15 February 2003 Round of 16	Schiltigheim	3–0	Toulouse	Schiltigheim
18:00 CET (UTC+1)	Ayvaz 2'; Weber 63'; Lemarchand 73'			Stadium: Stade de l'Aar; Attendance: 5,010; Referee: Bruno Ruffray

=== Coupe de la Ligue ===
11 October 2002 First round	Saint-Étienne	3–2	Toulouse	Saint-Étienne
20:00 CEST (UTC+2)	Compan 17'; N'Dour 24'; Carteron 90'		Lièvre 54'; Giresse 62'	Stadium: Stade Geoffroy-Guichard; Attendance: 9,697; Referee: Franck Glochon

== Statistics ==
=== Appearances and goals ===
No.	Pos	Nat	Player	Total		Ligue 2		Coupe de France		Coupe de la Ligue	
No.	Pos	Nat	Player	Apps	Goals	Apps	Goals	Apps	Goals	Apps	Goals
Goalkeepers
1	GK	(France) FRA	Christophe Revault	38	0	34	0	3	0	1	0
16	GK	(France) FRA	Jérémie Moreau	7	0	4	0	2+1	0	0	0
Defenders
3	DF	(France) FRA	William Prunier	41	1	37	1	3	0	1	0
4	DF	(France) FRA	Mathieu Puig	7	0	3+2	0	2	0	0	0
5	DF	(France) FRA	Mathieu Zandona	1	0	0	0	0+1	0	0	0
7	DF	(France) FRA	Stéphane Lièvre	39	1	36	0	2	0	1	1
12	DF	(Republic of the Congo) CGO	Lucien Aubey	34	0	28+2	0	2+1	0	1	0
13	DF	(Ivory Coast) CIV	Issoumaila Dao	9	0	2+6	0	1	0	0	0
21	DF	(France) FRA	Othmane Hamama	22	1	13+4	1	4	0	1	0
28	DF	(France) FRA	Albin Ebondo	3	0	0	0	2+1	0	0	0
Midfielders
6	MF	(France) FRA	Julien Cardy	39	0	24+11	0	3	0	0+1	0
8	MF	(France) FRA	Thibault Giresse	35	8	22+8	6	3+1	1	1	1
10	MF	(France) FRA	Nabil Taïder	33	1	30	1	2	0	1	0
11	MF	(France) FRA	Sylvain Didot	25	1	11+12	1	2	0	0	0
14	MF	(France) FRA	Ulrick Chavas	11	0	1+7	0	2+1	0	0	0
15	MF	(France) FRA	Christophe Avezac	30	5	17+9	2	4	3	0	0
17	MF	(France) FRA	Anthony Braizat	29	9	16+8	8	4	1	0+1	0
17	DF	(Togo) TOG	Alaixys Romao	1	0	0	0	0+1	0	0	0
19	MF	(Senegal) SEN	Ousmane N'Doye	35	3	23+8	3	3	0	1	0
20	MF	(Cameroon) CMR	Achille Emaná	38	3	34+1	3	1+1	0	1	0
22	MF	(France) FRA	Aurélien Mazel	40	0	35	0	4	0	1	0
23	MF	(Algeria) ALG	Nasser Hakkar	1	0	1	0	0	0	0	0
25	MF	(France) FRA	Nicolas Dieuze	16	1	8+6	1	2	0	0	0
Forwards
9	FW	(France) FRA	Anthony Bancarel	23	4	6+12	2	3+2	2	0	0
24	FW	(France) FRA	Cédric Fauré	39	20	33+3	20	1+1	0	1	0
31	FW	(France) FRA	Jérémy Blayac	5	0	3	0	0+2	0	0	0
	FW	(Benin) BEN	Nasser Adechokan	1	0	0	0	0+1	0	0	0

Source: Competitions

=== Goalscorers ===
Rank	No.	Pos.	Nat.	Name	Ligue 2	Coupe de France	Coupe de la Ligue	Total
1	24	FW	(France)	Cédric Fauré	20	0	0	20
2	17	MF	(France)	Anthony Braizat	8	1	0	9
3	8	MF	(France)	Thibault Giresse	6	1	1	8
4	15	MF	(France)	Christophe Avezac	2	3	0	5
5	9	FW	(France)	Anthony Bancarel	2	2	0	4
Totals					50	7	2	59
