= 2002–03 Le Mans UC72 season =

Le Mans
2002–03 season
- President: Noël Peyramayou
- Head coach: Thierry Goudet
- Stadium: Stade Léon-Bollée
- Ligue 2: 2nd (promoted)
- Coupe de France: Round of 32
- Coupe de la Ligue: Round of 16
- Top goalscorer: League: Daniel Cousin (19); All: Daniel Cousin (23)
- Average home league attendance: 7,360

The 2002–03 season was the 18th season in the existence of Le Mans UC72 and the club's thirteenth consecutive season in the second division of French football. In addition to the domestic league, Le Mans participated in this season's edition of the Coupe de France and the Coupe de la Ligue.

== Transfers ==
=== In ===
No.	Pos	Player	Transferred to	Fee	Date	Source
–	MF	(Algeria) Ahmed Aït Ouarab	(France) FC Martigues		1 July 2002	
–	MF	(France) Philippe Celdran	(France) Sedan		1 July 2002	
–	MF	(France) Fabrice Pancrate	(France) Guingamp		1 July 2002	
–	FW	(France) Laurent Peyrelade	(France) Sedan		1 July 2002	
–	DF	(France) Steven Pelé	(France) Rennes B	Loan	29 August 2002	
–	FW	(France) Olivier Thomas	(France) Troyes		24 January 2003	

== Competitions ==
Win Draw Loss

=== Overall record ===
Competition	First match	Last match	Starting round	Final position	Record							
Competition	First match	Last match	Starting round	Final position	Pld	W	D	L	GF	GA	GD	Win %
Ligue 2	3 August 2002	23 May 2003	Matchday 1	2nd	38	18	14	6	49	33	+16	47.37
Coupe de France	14 December 2002	25 January 2003	Seventh round	Round of 16	3	2	1	0	11	5	+6	66.67
Coupe de la Ligue	11 October 2002	18 January 2003	First round	Round of 16	3	2	0	1	6	3	+3	66.67
Total					44	22	15	7	66	41	+25	50.00

Source: Competitions

=== Ligue 2 ===
==== League table ====
Pos	Team	Pld	W	D	L	GF	GA	GD	Pts	Promotion or Relegation
1	Toulouse (C, P)	38	21	9	8	50	24	+26	72	Promotion to Ligue 1
2	Le Mans (P)	38	18	14	6	49	33	+16	68	Promotion to Ligue 1
3	Metz (P)	38	19	10	9	52	29	+23	67	Promotion to Ligue 1
4	Lorient	38	18	11	9	43	29	+14	65	
5	Châteauroux	38	16	12	10	40	35	+5	60	

Source: Ligue 2
(C) Champions; (P) Promoted

==== Results summary ====
Overall								Home						Away					
Pld	W	D	L	GF	GA	GD	Pts	W	D	L	GF	GA	GD	W	D	L	GF	GA	GD
38	18	14	6	49	33	+16	68	13	5	1	28	9	+19	5	9	5	21	24	−3

Source: Ligue 1

==== Results by round ====
Round	1	2	3	4	5	6	7	8	9	10	11	12	13	14	15	16	17	18	19	20	21	22	23	24	25	26	27	28	29	30	31	32	33	34	35	36	37	38
Ground	A	H	A	H	A	H	A	A	H	A	H	A	H	A	H	A	H	A	H	A	H	A	H	A	H	H	A	H	A	H	A	H	A	H	A	H	A	H
Result	W	W	W	W	W	W	L	D	W	L	W	D	W	D	W	D	D	L	W	W	D	L	L	L	W	D	D	D	D	W	D	W	W	W	D	W	D	D
Position	6	3	1	1	1	1	1	1	1	1	1	1	1	1	1	1	1	1	1	1	1	1	2	4	2	3	2	2	4	4	4	3	2	2	2	2	2	2

Source: Ligue 2
A = Away; H = Home; W = Win; D = Draw; L = Loss

==== Matches ====
3 August 2002 1	Amiens	0–1	Le Mans	Amiens
20:00 CET (UTC+1)

10 August 2002 2	Le Mans	3–1	Gueugnon	Le Mans
--:-- CET (UTC+1)

17 August 2002 3	Reims	1–2	Le Mans	Reims
--:-- CET (UTC+1)

24 August 2002 4	Le Mans	2–1	Toulouse	Le Mans
20:00 CEST (UTC+2)	Peyrelade 10'; Cousin 31'	Report	Braizat 24'	Stadium: Stade Léon-Bollée; Attendance: 7,924; Referee: Tony Chapron

1 September 2002 5	Lorient	3–4	Le Mans	Lorient
--:-- CET (UTC+1)

5 September 2002 6	Le Mans	1–0	Metz	Le Mans
20:30 CEST (UTC+2)	Cousin 11'	Report		Stadium: Stade Léon-Bollée; Attendance: 8,994; Referee: Bertrand Layec

10 September 2002 7	Istres	1–0	Le Mans	Istres
--:-- CET (UTC+1)

14 September 2002 8	Saint-Étienne	0–0	Le Mans	Saint-Étienne
--:-- CET (UTC+1)

21 September 2002 9	Le Mans	1–0	Niort	Le Mans
--:-- CET (UTC+1)

28 September 2002 10	Wasquehal	2–1	Le Mans	Wasquehal
--:-- CET (UTC+1)

4 October 2002 11	Le Mans	3–0	Nancy	Le Mans
--:-- CET (UTC+1)

19 October 2002 12	Créteil	2–2	Le Mans	Wasquehal
--:-- CET (UTC+1)

26 October 2002 13	Le Mans	2–0	Valence	Le Mans
--:-- CET (UTC+1)

1 November 2002 14	Caen	1–1	Le Mans	Caen
--:-- CET (UTC+1)

9 November 2002 15	Le Mans	1–0	Beauvais	Le Mans
--:-- CET (UTC+1)

15 November 2002 16	Châteauroux	1–1	Le Mans	Châteauroux
--:-- CET (UTC+1)

30 November 2002 17	Le Mans	1–1	Laval	Le Mans
--:-- CET (UTC+1)

4 December 2002 18	Clermont	1–0	Le Mans	Clermont
--:-- CET (UTC+1)

18 December 2002 19	Le Mans	1–0	Grenoble	Le Mans
--:-- CET (UTC+1)

15 January 2003 21	Le Mans	1–1	Reims	Le Mans
--:-- CET (UTC+1)

21 January 2003 22	Toulouse	2–0	Le Mans	Toulouse
19:00 CET (UTC+1)	Fauré 51', 81' (pen.)	Report		Stadium: Stadium de Toulouse; Attendance: 11,633; Referee: Bertrand Layec

28 January 2003 23	Le Mans	0–1	Lorient	Le Mans
--:-- CET (UTC+1)

31 January 2003 24	Metz	4–0	Le Mans	Metz
20:30 CET (UTC+1)	Bah 30'; Proment 41'; Adebayor 60', 66'	Report		Stadium: Stade Saint-Symphorien; Attendance: 9,966

5 February 2003 25	Le Mans	1–0	Istres	Le Mans
--:-- CET (UTC+1)

9 February 2003 26	Le Mans	2–2	Saint-Étienne	Le Mans
--:-- CET (UTC+1)

18 February 2003 20	Gueugnon	0–1	Le Mans	Gueugnon
--:-- CET (UTC+1)

22 February 2003 27	Niort	1–1	Le Mans	Niort
--:-- CET (UTC+1)

1 March 2003 28	Le Mans	0–0	Wasquehal	Le Mans
--:-- CET (UTC+1)

8 March 2003 29	Nancy	2–2	Le Mans	Nancy
--:-- CET (UTC+1)

21 March 2003 30	Le Mans	2–1	Créteil	Le Mans
--:-- CET (UTC+1)

28 March 2003 31	Valence	2–2	Le Mans	Valence
--:-- CET (UTC+1)

4 April 2003 32	Le Mans	2–0	Caen	Le Mans
--:-- CET (UTC+1)

12 April 2003 33	Beauvais	0–2	Le Mans	Beauvais
--:-- CET (UTC+1)

19 April 2003 34	Le Mans	1–0	Châteauroux	Le Mans
--:-- CET (UTC+1)

2 May 2003 35	Laval	1–1	Le Mans	Laval
--:-- CET (UTC+1)

10 May 2003 36	Le Mans	3–0	Clermont	Le Mans
--:-- CET (UTC+1)

16 May 2003 37	Grenoble	0–0	Le Mans	Grenoble
--:-- CET (UTC+1)		Report

23 May 2003 38	Le Mans	1–1	Amiens	Le Mans
--:-- CET (UTC+1)		Report

=== Coupe de France ===
14 December 2002 Eighth round	Saint-Lô	2–5	Le Mans	Saint-Lô
--:-- CET (UTC+1)

4 January 2003 Round of 64	Carquefou	1–4 (a.e.t.)	Le Mans	Carquefou
--:-- CET (UTC+1)

25 January 2003 Round of 32	Libourne S-S	2–2 (a.e.t.) (12–11 p)	Le Mans	Libourne
--:-- CET (UTC+1)				Stadium: Stade Jean Antoine Moueix; Attendance: 7,500; Referee: Damien Ledentu

=== Coupe de la Ligue ===
11 October 2002 First round	Le Mans	3–0	Valence	Le Mans
--:-- CET (UTC+1)

7 December 2002 Round of 32	Le Mans	1–0	Grenoble	Le Mans
--:-- CET (UTC+1)

18 January 2003 Round of 16	Saint-Étienne	3–2	Le Mans	Saint-Étienne
--:-- CET (UTC+1)
