= 2002–03 Stade de Reims season =

Reims
2002–03 season
- President: Christophe Chenut
- Head coach: Denis Goavec
- Stadium: Stade Auguste-Delaune
- Ligue 2: 20th (relegated)
- Coupe de France: Round of 64
- Coupe de la Ligue: First round
- Top goalscorer: Cédric Liabeuf (12)
- Average home league attendance: 5,691

The 2002–03 Stade de Reims season was the club's 72nd season in existence and the first season back in the second division of French football since 1990. In addition to the domestic league, Reims participated in this season's edition of the Coupe de France and Coupe de la Ligue. The season covered the period from 1 July 2002 to 30 June 2003.

Reims immediately returned to the Championnat National after losing to Toulouse in the penultimate round.

== Transfers ==
=== In ===
No.	Pos	Player	Transferred from	Fee	Date	Source
15			TBD		1 July 2002	

=== Out ===
No.	Pos	Player	Transferred to	Fee	Date	Source
15			TBD		1 July 2002	

== Pre-season and friendlies ==
Win Draw Loss

== Competitions ==
=== Overview ===
Competition	First match	Last match	Starting round	Final position	Record							
Competition	First match	Last match	Starting round	Final position	Pld	W	D	L	GF	GA	GD	Win %
Ligue 2	2 August 2002	23 May 2002	Matchday 1	20th	38	6	17	15	31	45	−14	15.79
Coupe de France	23 November 2002	11 January 2003	Round of 64		3	2	0	1	7	3	+4	66.67
Coupe de la Ligue	23 September 2002		First round	First round	1	0	1	0	0	0	+0	0.00
Total					42	8	18	16	38	48	−10	19.05

Source: Competitions

=== Ligue 2 ===
==== League table ====
Pos	Team	Pld	W	D	L	GF	GA	GD	Pts	Promotion or Relegation
16	Istres	38	10	13	15	32	53	−21	43	
17	Créteil	38	8	18	12	39	42	−3	42	
18	Beauvais (R)	38	9	10	19	20	32	−12	37	Relegation to Championnat National [fr]
19	Wasquehal (R)	38	6	18	14	26	39	−13	36	Relegation to Championnat National [fr]
20	Reims (R)	38	6	17	15	31	45	−14	35	Relegation to Championnat National [fr]

Source: Ligue 2
(R) Relegated

==== Results summary ====
Overall								Home						Away					
Pld	W	D	L	GF	GA	GD	Pts	W	D	L	GF	GA	GD	W	D	L	GF	GA	GD
38	6	17	15	31	45	−14	35	5	7	7	19	20	−1	1	10	8	12	25	−13

Source: Ligue 2

==== Results by round ====
Round	1	2	3	4	5	6	7	8	9	10	11	12	13	14	15	16	17	18	19	20	21	22	23	24	25	26	27	28	29	30	31	32	33	34	35	36	37	38
Ground	H	A	H	A	H	A	H	A	H	A	H	A	H	A	H	A	H	H	A	H	A	H	A	H	A	H	A	H	A	H	A	H	A	H	A	A	H	A
Result	L	D	L	D	D	D	D	L	D	D	W	L	W	W	L	L	D	D	L	L	D	W	D	W	L	W	D	L	D	L	L	D	L	D	D	D	L	L
Position	17	15	17	19	17	17	19	19	19	19	17	18	17	17	17	19	19	18	18	18	18	17	16	18	19	16	17	20	20	20	20	20	20	20	18	18	20	20

Source: Ligue 2
A = Away; H = Home; W = Win; D = Draw; L = Loss

==== Matches ====
2 August 2002 1	Reims	1–3	Lorient	Reims
CEST (UTC+2)				Stadium: Stade Auguste-Delaune

10 August 2002 2	Metz	0–0	Reims	Metz
CEST (UTC+2)

17 August 2002 3	Reims	1–2	Le Mans	Reims
CEST (UTC+2)				Stadium: Stade Auguste-Delaune

25 August 2002 4	Saint-Étienne	0–0	Reims	Saint-Étienne
CEST (UTC+2)

31 August 2002 5	Reims	1–1	Niort	Reims
CEST (UTC+2)				Stadium: Stade Auguste-Delaune

4 September 2002 6	Wasquehal	1–1	Reims	Wasquehal
CEST (UTC+2)

11 September 2002 7	Reims	0–0	Beauvais	Reims
CEST (UTC+2)				Stadium: Stade Auguste-Delaune

14 September 2002 8	Laval	1–0	Reims	Laval
CEST (UTC+2)

21 September 2002 9	Reims	0–0	Créteil	Reims
CEST (UTC+2)				Stadium: Stade Auguste-Delaune

28 September 2002 10	Caen	1–1	Reims	Caen
CEST (UTC+2)

5 October 2002 11	Reims	2–0	Valence	Reims
CEST (UTC+2)				Stadium: Stade Auguste-Delaune

19 October 2002 12	Châteauroux	3–1	Reims	Châteauroux
CEST (UTC+2)

26 October 2002 13	Reims	1–0	Nancy	Reims
CEST (UTC+2)				Stadium: Stade Auguste-Delaune

2 November 2002 14	Amiens	0–1	Reims	Amiens
CET (UTC+1)

9 November 2002 15	Reims	0–1	Grenoble	Reims
CET (UTC+1)				Stadium: Stade Auguste-Delaune

16 November 2002 16	Clermont	3–2	Reims	Clermont-Ferrand
CET (UTC+1)

30 November 2002 17	Reims	1–1	Gueugnon	Reims
CET (UTC+1)				Stadium: Stade Auguste-Delaune

4 December 2002 18	Reims	2–2	Istres	Reims
CET (UTC+1)				Stadium: Stade Auguste-Delaune

19 December 2002 19	Toulouse	2–0	Reims	Toulouse
CET (UTC+1)

15 January 2003 21	Le Mans	1–1	Reims	Le Mans
CET (UTC+1)

22 January 2003 22	Reims	1–0	Saint-Étienne	Reims
CET (UTC+1)				Stadium: Stade Auguste-Delaune

29 January 2003 23	Niort	0–0	Reims	Niort
CET (UTC+1)

4 February 2003 25	Beauvais	1–0	Reims	Beauvais
CET (UTC+1)

7 February 2003 26	Reims	3–2	Laval	Reims
CET (UTC+1)				Stadium: Stade Auguste-Delaune

22 February 2003 27	Créteil	1–1	Reims	Créteil
CET (UTC+1)

1 March 2003 28	Reims	1–2	Caen	Reims
CET (UTC+1)				Stadium: Stade Auguste-Delaune

8 March 2003 29	Valence	0–0	Reims	Valence
CET (UTC+1)

16 March 2003 20	Reims	0–2	Metz	Reims
CET (UTC+1)				Stadium: Stade Auguste-Delaune

22 March 2003 30	Reims	0–1	Châteauroux	Reims
CET (UTC+1)				Stadium: Stade Auguste-Delaune

28 March 2003 31	Nancy	2–1	Reims	Tomblaine
CET (UTC+1)

5 April 2003 32	Reims	1–1	Amiens	Reims
CET (UTC+1)				Stadium: Stade Auguste-Delaune

12 April 2003 33	Grenoble	4–1	Reims	Grenoble
CET (UTC+1)

19 April 2003 34	Reims	0–0	Clermont	Reims
CET (UTC+1)				Stadium: Stade Auguste-Delaune

25 April 2003 24	Reims	4–1	Wasquehal	Reims
CET (UTC+1)				Stadium: Stade Auguste-Delaune

3 May 2003 35	Gueugnon	2–2	Reims	Gueugnon
CET (UTC+1)

10 May 2003 36	Istres	0–0	Reims	Istres
CET (UTC+1)

16 May 2003 37	Reims	0–1	Toulouse	Reims
CET (UTC+1)				Stadium: Stade Auguste-Delaune

23 May 2003 38	Lorient	3–0	Reims	Lorient
CET (UTC+1)

=== Coupe de France ===
23 November 2002 Seventh round	US Sarre-Union	0–4	Reims
CET (UTC+1)			Ludovic Liron 34'; Bertrand Tchami 75'; Frédéric Formeaux 78'; Jérôme Frétard 87'

14 December 2002 Eighth round	Reims	3–1	Club Franciscain	La Courneuve
CET (UTC+1)	Laquait 2'; Haddadou 47'; Létang 89'		Percin 63'	Stadium: Parc des Sports de Marville; Referee: Valeao

11 January 2003 Round of 64	Reims	0–2	Nantes	Reims
CET (UTC+1)				Stadium: Stade Auguste-Delaune

=== Coupe de la Ligue ===
23 September 2002 First round	Sedan	0–0 (a.e.t.) (5–4 p)	Reims	Sedan
CEST (UTC+2)				Stadium: Stade Louis Dugauguez
