= 2002–03 Montpellier HSC season =

Montpellier HSC
2002–03 season
- President: Louis Nicollin
- Head coach: Gérard Bernardet
- Stadium: Stade de la Mosson
- Ligue 1: 16th
- Coupe de France: Round of 64
- Coupe de la Ligue: Round of 32
- Top goalscorer: League: Valéry Mézague (6); All: Valéry Mézague (7)
- Average home league attendance: 12,759

The 2002–03 season was the 84th season in the history of Montpellier HSC and the club's second consecutive season in the top flight of French football. In addition to the domestic league, Montpellier participated in this season's editions of the Coupe de France and Coupe de la Ligue.

== Pre-season and friendlies ==
Win Draw Loss

During the season, Montpellier played eight friendlies and training matches including one against a national team.

2 July 2002 Friendly	Montpellier	4–1	Marseille

6 July 2002 Friendly	Saint-Étienne	1–1	Montpellier	Cluses

13 July 2002 Friendly	Monaco	0–0	Montpellier	Annecy

17 July 2002 Friendly	Sète	0–1	Montpellier	Sète

20 July 2002 Friendly	Bordeaux	0–0	Montpellier	Villenave d'Ornon

23 July 2002 Friendly	Montpellier	4–0	Haiti

26 July 2002 Friendly	Montpellier	1–1	Metz	Grau du Roi

12 October 2002 Friendly	Montpellier	1–1	Auxerre	Nîmes

== Competitions ==
=== Overall record ===
Competition	First match	Last match	Starting round	Final position	Record							
Competition	First match	Last match	Starting round	Final position	Pld	W	D	L	GF	GA	GD	Win %
Ligue 1	3 August 2002	May 2003	Matchday 1	16th	38	10	10	18	37	54	−17	26.32
Coupe de France	4 January 2003		Round of 64	Round of 64	1	0	0	1	3	5	−2	0.00
Coupe de la Ligue	7 December 2002		Round of 32	Round of 32	1	0	0	1	1	2	−1	0.00
Total					40	10	10	20	41	61	−20	25.00

Source: Competitions

=== Ligue 1 ===
==== League table ====
Pos	Team	Pld	W	D	L	GF	GA	GD	Pts	Qualification or relegation
14	Lille	38	10	12	16	29	44	−15	42	
15	Rennes	38	10	10	18	35	45	−10	40	
16	Montpellier	38	10	10	18	37	54	−17	40	
17	Ajaccio	38	9	12	17	29	49	−20	39	
18	Le Havre (R)	38	10	8	20	27	47	−20	38	Relegation to Ligue 2

Source: Ligue 1
Rules for classification: 1) points; 2) goal difference; 3) number of goals scored.
(R) Relegated

==== Results summary ====
Overall								Home						Away					
Pld	W	D	L	GF	GA	GD	Pts	W	D	L	GF	GA	GD	W	D	L	GF	GA	GD
38	10	10	18	37	54	−17	40	6	7	6	19	19	0	4	3	12	18	35	−17

Source: Ligue 1

==== Results by round ====
Round	1	2	3	4	5	6	7	8	9	10	11	12	13	14	15	16	17	18	19	20	21	22	23	24	25	26	27	28	29	30	31	32	33	34	35	36	37	38
Ground	H	A	H	A	H	A	H	A	H	H	A	H	A	H	A	H	A	H	A	H	A	H	A	H	A	H	A	A	H	A	H	A	H	A	H	A	H	A
Result	W	L	L	L	D	D	W	L	D	L	L	D	L	W	D	D	L	L	D	D	L	D	L	L	L	W	W	L	W	W	L	W	L	W	W	L	D	L
Position	5	10	14	16	17	17	13	16	16	18	18	18	18	17	17	18	19	20	20	20	20	19	19	19	19	19	19	20	18	16	18	15	17	15	14	14	15	16

A = Away; H = Home; W = Win; D = Draw; L = Loss

==== Matches ====
3 August 2002 1	Montpellier	1–0	Rennes	Montpellier
20:00	Silvestre 89' (pen.)			Stadium: Stade de la Mosson; Attendance: 12,692; Referee: Thierry Auriac

8 August 2002 2	Auxerre	2–0	Montpellier	Auxerre
20:00	Cissé 73'; Benjani 89'			Stadium: Stade de l'Abbé Deschamps; Attendance: 11,864; Referee: Alain Hamer (Luxembourg)

17 August 2002 3	Montpellier	0–1	Bordeaux	Montpellier
17:15			Smertin 20'	Stadium: Stade de la Mosson; Attendance: 16,981; Referee: Claude Colombo

24 August 2002 4	Nice	2–1	Montpellier	Nice
20:00				Stadium: Stade du Ray; Attendance: 11,422; Referee: Améziane Khendek

31 August 2002 5	Montpellier	0–0	Le Havre	Montpellier
20:00				Stadium: Stade de la Mosson; Attendance: 8,550; Referee: Éric Poulat

11 September 2002 6	Ajaccio	0–0	Montpellier	Ajaccio
20:30				Stadium: Stade François Coty; Attendance: 5,079; Referee: Pascal Viléo

14 September 2002 7	Montpellier	1–0	Lille	Montpellier
20:00	Mansaré 70'			Stadium: Stade de la Mosson; Attendance: 8,991; Referee: Stéphane Bré

21 September 2002 8	Strasbourg	3–2	Montpellier	Strasbourg
20:00	Ljuboja 25', 85'; Bertin 90+6' (pen.)		Mézague 56', 69'	Stadium: Stade de la Meinau; Attendance: 9,164; Referee: Bruno Ruffray

28 September 2002 9	Montpellier	1–1	Paris Saint-Germain	Montpellier
20:00	Bamogo 13'		Paulo César 65'	Stadium: Stade de la Mosson; Attendance: 18,456; Referee: Bruno Coué

5 October 2002 10	Montpellier	0–2	Lens	Montpellier
20:00			Moreira 42'; Utaka 89'	Stadium: Stade de la Mosson; Attendance: 11,717; Referee: Stéphane Moulin

12 April 2003 33	Montpellier	0–2	Sochaux	Montpellier
20:00			Frau 37'; Santos 54'	Stadium: Stade de la Mosson; Attendance: 12,177; Referee: Philippe Kalt

19 April 2003 34	Bastia	1–2	Montpellier	Furiani
20:00	Maurice 68'		Robert 11'; Doumeng 78'	Stadium: Stade Armand Cesari; Attendance: 7,522; Referee: Gilles Veissière

3 May 2003 35	Montpellier	1–0	Nantes	Montpellier
20:00	Mansaré 29' (pen.)			Stadium: Stade de la Mosson; Attendance: 13,731; Referee: Bruno Ruffray

10 May 2003 36	Monaco	3–1	Montpellier	Monaco
17:15				Stadium: Stade Louis II; Attendance: 8,360

20 May 2003 37	Montpellier	1–1	Lyon	Montpellier
20:30				Stadium: Stade de la Mosson; Attendance: 19,764

24 May 2003 38	Rennes	3–1	Montpellier	Rennes
20:30				Stadium: Stade de la Route de Lorient; Attendance: 18,237

=== Coupe de France ===
4 January 2003 Round of 64	Amiens	5–3 (a.e.t.)	Montpellier	Amiens
20:00	Diallo 13', 90'; Moreau 80'; Duchemin 96'; Dorn 117'		Carotti 12', 84'; Mézague 22'	Stadium: Stade de la Licorne; Attendance: 3,789; Referee: Stéphane Lannoy

=== Coupe de la Ligue ===
7 December 2002 Round of 32	Montpellier	1–2	Bordeaux	Montpellier
18:00	Gueï 10' (pen.)		Sávio 72'; Pauleta 79' (pen.)	Stadium: Stade de la Mosson; Attendance: 6,698; Referee: Laurent Duhamel

== Statistics ==
Rank	Pos.	No.	Player	Ligue 1	Coupe de France	Coupe de la Ligue	Total
19	MF	19	(Cameroon) Valéry Mézague	6	1	0	7
2	FW	26	(Burkina Faso) Habib Bamogo	4	0	0	4
2	MF	14	(France) Cédric Barbosa	4	0	0	4
2	FW	29	(Ivory Coast) Marc-Éric Gueï	3	0	1	4
2	MF	11	(Mali) Fodé Mansaré	4	0	0	4
Total				37	3	1	41
