= 2002–03 OGC Nice season =

Nice
2002–03 season
- President: Maurice Cohen
- Head coach: Gernot Rohr
- Stadium: Stade du Ray
- Ligue 1: 10th
- Coupe de France: Round of 64
- Coupe de la Ligue: Third round
- Top goalscorer: League: Kaba Diawara (12); All: Kaba Diawara (12)
- Average home league attendance: 13,794
- Biggest win: Nice 4–0 Strasbourg
- Biggest defeat: Bordeaux 4–0 Nice

The 2002–03 season was the 99th season in the existence of OGC Nice and the club's first season back in the top-flight of French football. In addition to the domestic league, Nice also participated in the editions of the Coupe de France and Coupe de la Ligue during this season.

== Pre-season and friendlies ==
Win Draw Loss

== Competitions ==
=== Overview ===
Competition	First match	Last match	Starting round	Final position	Record							
Competition	First match	Last match	Starting round	Final position	Pld	W	D	L	GF	GA	GD	Win %
Ligue 1	3 August 2002	24 May 2003	Matchday 1	10th	38	13	16	9	39	31	+8	34.21
Coupe de France	4 January 2003		Round of 64	Round of 64	1	0	1	0	0	0	+0	0.00
Coupe de la Ligue	7 December 2002		Third round	Third round	1	0	0	1	0	1	−1	0.00
Total					40	13	17	10	39	32	+7	32.50

Source: Competitions

=== Ligue 1 ===
==== League table ====
Pos	Team	Pld	W	D	L	GF	GA	GD	Pts	Qualification or relegation
8	Lens	38	14	15	9	43	31	+12	57	Qualification to UEFA Cup qualifying round (Note: Lens qualified for the UEFA Cup qualifying round through the UEFA Fair Play ranking award.)
9	Nantes	38	16	8	14	37	39	−2	56	Qualification to Intertoto Cup third round
10	Nice	38	13	16	9	39	31	+8	55	Qualification to Intertoto Cup second round
11	Paris Saint-Germain	38	14	12	12	47	36	+11	54	
12	Bastia	38	12	11	15	40	48	−8	47	

Source: Ligue 1
Rules for classification: 1) points; 2) goal difference; 3) number of goals scored.

==== Results summary ====
Overall								Home						Away					
Pld	W	D	L	GF	GA	GD	Pts	W	D	L	GF	GA	GD	W	D	L	GF	GA	GD
38	13	16	9	39	31	+8	55	10	7	2	24	8	+16	3	9	7	15	23	−8

Source: Ligue 1

==== Results by round ====
Round	1	2	3	4	5	6	7	8	9	10	11	12	13	14	15	16	17	18	19	20	21	22	23	24	25	26	27	28	29	30	31	32	33	34	35	36	37	38
Ground	H	H	A	H	A	H	A	H	A	H	A	H	A	H	A	H	A	H	A	A	H	A	H	A	H	A	H	A	H	A	H	A	H	A	H	A	H	A
Result	L	W	W	W	D	W	D	W	L	W	D	D	D	W	W	D	L	W	L	D	W	D	D	L	W	L	D	D	D	D	L	W	W	D	D	L	D	L
Position	15	7	3	1	1	1	1	1	2	2	1	3	3	1	1	1	2	1	2	2	1	2	3	6	3	4	4	7	6	7	9	9	6	7	7	8	8	10

Source: Ligue 1
A = Away; H = Home; W = Win; D = Draw; L = Loss

==== Matches ====
3 August 2002 1	Nice	1–2	Le Havre	Nice
20:00 CEST (UTC+2)		Report		Stadium: Stade du Ray

10 August 2002 2	Nice	4–0	Strasbourg	Nice
20:00 CEST (UTC+2)		Report		Stadium: Stade du Ray

17 August 2002 3	Lille	0–3	Nice	Lille
20:00 CEST (UTC+2)		Report		Stadium: Stade Grimonprez-Jooris

24 August 2002 4	Nice	2–1	Montpellier	Nice
20:00 CEST (UTC+2)		Report		Stadium: Stade du Ray

31 August 2002 5	Paris Saint-Germain	1–1	Nice	Paris
20:00 CEST (UTC+2)		Report		Stadium: Parc des Princes

11 September 2002 6	Nice	2–0	Marseille	Nice
18:00 CEST (UTC+2)		Report		Stadium: Stade du Ray

14 September 2002 7	Guingamp	0–0	Nice	Guingamp
20:00 CEST (UTC+2)		Report		Stadium: Stade de Roudourou

21 September 2002 8	Nice	1–0	Troyes	Nice
20:00 CEST (UTC+2)		Report		Stadium: Stade du Ray

28 September 2002 9	Sochaux	1–0	Nice	Montbéliard
20:00 CEST (UTC+2)		Report		Stadium: Stade Auguste Bonal

5 October 2002 10	Nice	2–0	Bastia	Nice
20:00 CEST (UTC+2)		Report		Stadium: Stade du Ray

19 October 2002 11	Nantes	0–0	Nice	Nantes
20:00 CEST (UTC+2)		Report		Stadium: Stade de la Beaujoire

26 October 2002 12	Nice	0–0	Lens	Nice
20:00 CEST (UTC+2)		Report		Stadium: Stade du Ray

2 November 2002 13	Lyon	2–2	Nice	Lyon
17:15 CET (UTC+1)		Report		Stadium: Stade de Gerland

8 November 2002 14	Nice	1–0	Monaco	Nice
20:45 CET (UTC+1)		Report		Stadium: Stade du Ray

16 November 2002 15	Auxerre	0–2	Nice	Auxerre
17:30 CET (UTC+1)		Report		Stadium: Stade de l'Abbé-Deschamps

23 November 2002 16	Nice	0–0	Rennes	Nice
20:00 CET (UTC+1)		Report		Stadium: Stade du Ray

30 November 2002 17	Sedan	3–0	Nice	Sedan
20:00 CET (UTC+1)		Report		Stadium: Stade Louis Dugauguez

3 December 2002 18	Nice	3–0	Ajaccio	Nice
20:45 CET (UTC+1)		Report		Stadium: Stade du Ray

15 December 2002 19	Bordeaux	4–0	Nice	Bordeaux
20:00 CET (UTC+1)		Report		Stadium: Stade Chaban-Delmas

20 December 2002 20	Strasbourg	0–0	Nice	Strasbourg
20:30 CET (UTC+1)		Report		Stadium: Stade de la Meinau

11 January 2003 21	Nice	2–0	Lille	Nice
20:00 CET (UTC+1)		Report		Stadium: Stade du Ray

15 January 2003 22	Montpellier	2–2	Nice	Montpellier
20:30 CET (UTC+1)		Report		Stadium: Stade de la Mosson

22 January 2003 23	Nice	0–0	Paris Saint-Germain	Nice
20:30 CET (UTC+1)		Report		Stadium: Stade du Ray

28 January 2003 24	Marseille	2–0	Nice	Marseille
20:45 CET (UTC+1)		Report		Stadium: Stade Vélodrome

1 February 2003 25	Nice	1–0	Guingamp	Nice
20:00 CET (UTC+1)		Report		Stadium: Stade du Ray

5 February 2003 26	Troyes	1–0	Nice	Troyes
20:30 CET (UTC+1)		Report		Stadium: Stade de l'Aube

8 February 2003 27	Nice	2–2	Sochaux	Nice
20:00 CET (UTC+1)		Report		Stadium: Stade du Ray

22 February 2003 28	Bastia	1–1	Nice	Furiani
20:00 CET (UTC+1)		Report		Stadium: Stade Armand Cesari

28 February 2003 29	Nice	1–1	Nantes	Nice
20:30 CET (UTC+1)		Report		Stadium: Stade du Ray

8 March 2003 30	Lens	0–0	Nice	Lens
20:00 CET (UTC+1)		Report		Stadium: Stade Bollaert-Delelis

23 March 2003 31	Nice	0–1	Lyon	Nice
20:45 CET (UTC+1)		Report		Stadium: Stade du Ray

6 April 2003 32	Monaco	0–1	Nice	Monaco
20:45 CEST (UTC+2)		Report		Stadium: Stade Louis II

12 April 2003 33	Nice	1–0	Auxerre	Nice
20:00 CEST (UTC+2)		Report		Stadium: Stade du Ray

19 April 2003 34	Rennes	2–2	Nice	Rennes
20:00 CEST (UTC+2)		Report		Stadium: Stade de la Route de Lorient

3 May 2003 35	Nice	0–0	Sedan	Nice
20:00 CEST (UTC+2)		Report		Stadium: Stade du Ray

10 May 2003 36	Ajaccio	2–0	Nice	Ajaccio
20:00 CEST (UTC+2)		Report		Stadium: Stade François Coty

20 May 2003 37	Nice	1–1	Bordeaux	Nice
20:30 CEST (UTC+2)		Report		Stadium: Stade du Ray

24 May 2003 38	Le Havre	2–1	Nice	Le Havre
20:30 CEST (UTC+2)		Report		Stadium: Stade Jules Deschaseaux

=== Coupe de France ===
4 January 2003 Round of 64	Nice	0–0 (a.e.t.) (2–4 p)	Metz	Nice
20:00 CET (UTC+1)				Stadium: Stade du Ray; Attendance: 9,153; Referee: Damien Ledentu

=== Coupe de la Ligue ===
7 December 2002 Third round	US Créteil-Lusitanos	1–0	Nice	Créteil
18:00 CET (UTC+1)	Dallet 66'			Stadium: Stade Dominique Duvauchelle; Attendance: 3,476; Referee: Améziane Khendek (Note: Khendek was replaced by Jean-Marc Rodolphe in the 57th minute.)
