= Didot =

Didot may refer to:

- Didot family, family of French printers, punch-cutters and publishers that flourished mainly in the 18th century
- Didot (typeface), a group of serif typefaces
- the Didot Point (typography)
- Sylvain Didot (born 1975), French footballer and coach, played for Pontivy, Brest, Toulouse, Reims, Avranches, Briochin
- Étienne Didot (born 1983), French footballer, has played for Rennes, Toulouse, Guingamp
