= 2002–03 En Avant de Guingamp season =

En Avant de Guingamp
2002–03 season
- President: Noël Le Graët
- Head coach: Bertrand Marchand
- Stadium: Stade de Roudourou
- Ligue 1: 7th
- Coupe de France: Round of 16
- Coupe de la Ligue: Round of 16
- Top goalscorer: League: Didier Drogba (17); All: Didier Drogba (21)
- Average home league attendance: 14,570
- Biggest win: Nantes 0–4 Guingamp
- Biggest defeat: Paris Saint-Germain 5–0 Guingamp

The 2002–03 season was the 91st season in the history of En Avant de Guingamp and the club's third consecutive season in the top flight of French football. In addition to the domestic league, Guingamp participated in this season's editions of the Coupe de France and the Coupe de la Ligue.

== Competitions ==
Win Draw Loss

=== Overall record ===
Competition	First match	Last match	Starting round	Final position	Record							
Competition	First match	Last match	Starting round	Final position	Pld	W	D	L	GF	GA	GD	Win %
Ligue 1	2 August 2002	24 May 2003	Matchday 1	7th	38	19	5	14	59	46	+13	50.00
Coupe de France	4 January 2003	15 February 2003	Round of 64	Round of 16	3	2	1	0	6	1	+5	66.67
Coupe de la Ligue	7 December 2002	19 January 2003	Round of 32	Round of 16	2	1	1	0	4	3	+1	50.00
Total					43	22	7	14	69	50	+19	51.16

Source: Competitions

=== Ligue 1 ===
==== League table ====
Pos	Team	Pld	W	D	L	GF	GA	GD	Pts	Qualification or relegation
5	Sochaux	38	17	13	8	46	31	+15	64	Qualification to UEFA Cup first round
6	Auxerre	38	18	10	10	38	29	+9	64	Qualification to UEFA Cup first round
7	Guingamp	38	19	5	14	59	46	+13	62	Qualification to Intertoto Cup third round
8	Lens	38	14	15	9	43	31	+12	57	Qualification to UEFA Cup qualifying round (Note: Lens qualified for the UEFA Cup qualifying round through the UEFA Fair Play ranking award.)
9	Nantes	38	16	8	14	37	39	−2	56	Qualification to Intertoto Cup third round

Source: Ligue 1
Rules for classification: 1) points; 2) goal difference; 3) number of goals scored.

==== Results summary ====
Overall								Home						Away					
Pld	W	D	L	GF	GA	GD	Pts	W	D	L	GF	GA	GD	W	D	L	GF	GA	GD
38	19	5	14	59	46	+13	62	11	4	4	32	16	+16	8	1	10	27	30	−3

Source: Ligue 1

==== Results by round ====
Round	1	2	3	4	5	6	7	8	9	10	11	12	13	14	15	16	17	18	19	20	21	22	23	24	25	26	27	28	29	30	31	32	33	34	35	36	37	38
Ground	H	A	H	A	H	A	H	A	H	A	H	H	A	H	A	H	A	H	A	H	A	H	A	H	A	H	A	H	A	A	H	A	H	A	H	A	H	A
Result	D	W	W	L	D	W	D	L	L	L	W	L	W	D	W	W	W	W	L	W	L	L	L	L	L	W	L	W	L	L	W	W	W	D	W	W	W	W
Position	7	4	1	5	6	4	3	8	11	12	11	12	10	11	9	5	4	3	6	3	7	7	8	9	12	11	12	11	12	12	12	10	10	10	9	7	7	7

Source: Ligue 1
A = Away; H = Home; W = Win; D = Draw; L = Loss

==== Matches ====
2 August 2002 1	Guingamp	3–3	Lyon	Guingamp
		Report		Stadium: Stade de Roudourou

10 August 2002 2	Ajaccio	0–2	Guingamp	Ajaccio
		Report

17 August 2002 3	Guingamp	3–0	Rennes	Guingamp
		Report		Stadium: Stade de Roudourou

24 August 2002 4	Auxerre	2–1	Guingamp	Auxerre
		Report

31 August 2002 5	Guingamp	0–0	Bordeaux	Guingamp
		Report		Stadium: Stade de Roudourou

11 September 2002 6	Le Havre	1–2	Guingamp	Le Havre
		Report

14 September 2002 7	Guingamp	0–0	Nice	Guingamp
		Report		Stadium: Stade de Roudourou

21 September 2002 8	Lille	2–1	Guingamp
		Report

28 September 2002 9	Guingamp	2–3	Strasbourg	Guingamp
		Report		Stadium: Stade de Roudourou

6 October 2002 10	Paris Saint-Germain	5–0	Guingamp	Paris
		Report		Stadium: Parc des Princes

19 October 2002 11	Guingamp	3–1	Montpellier	Guingamp
				Stadium: Stade de Roudourou

26 October 2002 12	Guingamp	0–1	Sedan	Guingamp
				Stadium: Stade de Roudourou

2 November 2002 13	Troyes	0–2	Guingamp	Troyes

9 November 2002 14	Guingamp	0–0	Marseille	Guingamp
				Stadium: Stade de Roudourou

16 November 2002 15	Bastia	0–2	Guingamp	Furiani

23 November 2002 16	Guingamp	2–0	Sochaux	Guingamp
				Stadium: Stade de Roudourou

1 December 2002 17	Lens	1–3	Guingamp

4 December 2002 18	Guingamp	2–0	Nantes	Guingamp
				Stadium: Stade de Roudourou

15 December 2002 19	Monaco	4–0	Guingamp

20 December 2002 20	Guingamp	3–1	Ajaccio	Guingamp
				Stadium: Stade de Roudourou

11 January 2003 21	Rennes	2–1	Guingamp	Rennes

15 January 2003 22	Guingamp	0–2	Auxerre	Guingamp
				Stadium: Stade de Roudourou

22 January 2003 23	Bordeaux	4–2	Guingamp	Bordeaux

29 January 2003 24	Guingamp	1–2	Le Havre	Guingamp
				Stadium: Stade de Roudourou

1 February 2003 25	Nice	1–0	Guingamp	Nice
				Stadium: Stade du Ray

8 February 2003 27	Strasbourg	3–1	Guingamp	Strasbourg
				Stadium: Stade de la Meinau

22 February 2003 28	Guingamp	3–2	Paris Saint-Germain	Guingamp
				Stadium: Stade de Roudourou

1 March 2003 29	Montpellier	2–0	Guingamp	Montpellier

8 March 2003 30	Sedan	2–0	Guingamp	Sedan, Ardennes
				Stadium: Stade Louis Dugauguez

18 March 2003 26	Guingamp	1–0	Lille	Guingamp
				Stadium: Stade de Roudourou

22 March 2003 31	Guingamp	2–0	Troyes	Guingamp
				Stadium: Stade de Roudourou

5 April 2003 32	Marseille	0–2	Guingamp	Marseille
				Stadium: Stade Vélodrome

12 April 2003 33	Guingamp	3–0	Bastia	Guingamp
				Stadium: Stade de Roudourou

19 April 2003 34	Sochaux	0–0	Guingamp	Montbéliard
				Stadium: Stade Auguste Bonal

3 May 2003 35	Guingamp	1–0	Lens	Guingamp
				Stadium: Stade de Roudourou

10 May 2003 36	Nantes	0–4	Guingamp	Nantes
				Stadium: Stade de la Beaujoire

20 May 2003 37	Guingamp	3–1	Monaco	Guingamp
				Stadium: Stade de Roudourou

24 May 2003 38	Lyon	1–4	Guingamp	Lyon
				Stadium: Stade de Gerland

=== Coupe de France ===
4 January 2003 Round of 64	Les Genêts d'Anglet	0–1	Guingamp	Anglet
20:00			Drogba 45'	Stadium: Parc des Sports d'Aguiléra; Attendance: 7,000; Referee: Eric Brocas

25 January 2003 Round of 32	AC Seyssinet-Pariset	1–5	Guingamp	Grenoble
16:00				Stadium: Stade Lesdiguières; Attendance: 9,000; Referee: Bruno Coué

15 February 2003 Round of 16	Angoulême Charente FC	0–0 (a.e.t.) (3–2 p)	Guingamp	Angoulême
20:00				Stadium: Stade Lebon; Attendance: 6,100; Referee: Hervé Piccirillo

=== Coupe de la Ligue ===
7 December 2002 Round of 32	Guingamp	1–0	Strasbourg	Guingamp
18:00	Fabbri 41'			Stadium: Stade de Roudourou; Attendance: 9,266; Referee: Pascal Viléo

19 January 2003 Round of 16	Guingamp	3–3 (a.e.t.) (2–4 p)	Nantes	Guingamp
15:00 CET (UTC+1)	Malouda 90+3', 114'; Bardon 110' (pen.)		Quint 59'; Gillet 101' (pen.); André 105'	Stadium: Stade Municipal de Roudourou; Attendance: 10,488; Referee: Damien Ledentu
