= Ebondo =

Ebondo is a surname. Notable people with the surname include:

- Albin Ebondo (born 1984), French footballer
- Syrine Ebondo (born 1983), Tunisian pole vaulter
