= Mathéo Didot =

French footballer (born 2002)

Personal information
- Date of birth: 25 April 2002 (age 24)
- Place of birth: France
- Height: 1.79 m (5 ft 10 in)
- Position: Midfielder

Team information
- Current team: Saint-Pierre Milizac

Senior career*
Years	Team	Apps	(Gls)
2020–2023	Guingamp II	50	(2)
2021–2022	Guingamp	1	(0)
2023–	Saint-Pierre Milizac	20	(3)
- * Club domestic league appearances and goals as of 7 December 2024

Mathéo Didot (born 25 April 2002) is a French professional footballer who plays as a midfielder for Championnat National 3 club Saint-Pierre Milizac.

== Club career ==
Didot made his debut with Guingamp in a 2–0 Ligue 2 win over AC Ajaccio on 13 March 2021.

== Personal life ==
Didot is the son of Sylvain Didot and nephew of Étienne Didot, both former professional footballers.
