= Christophe Revault =

French association football player (1972–2021)

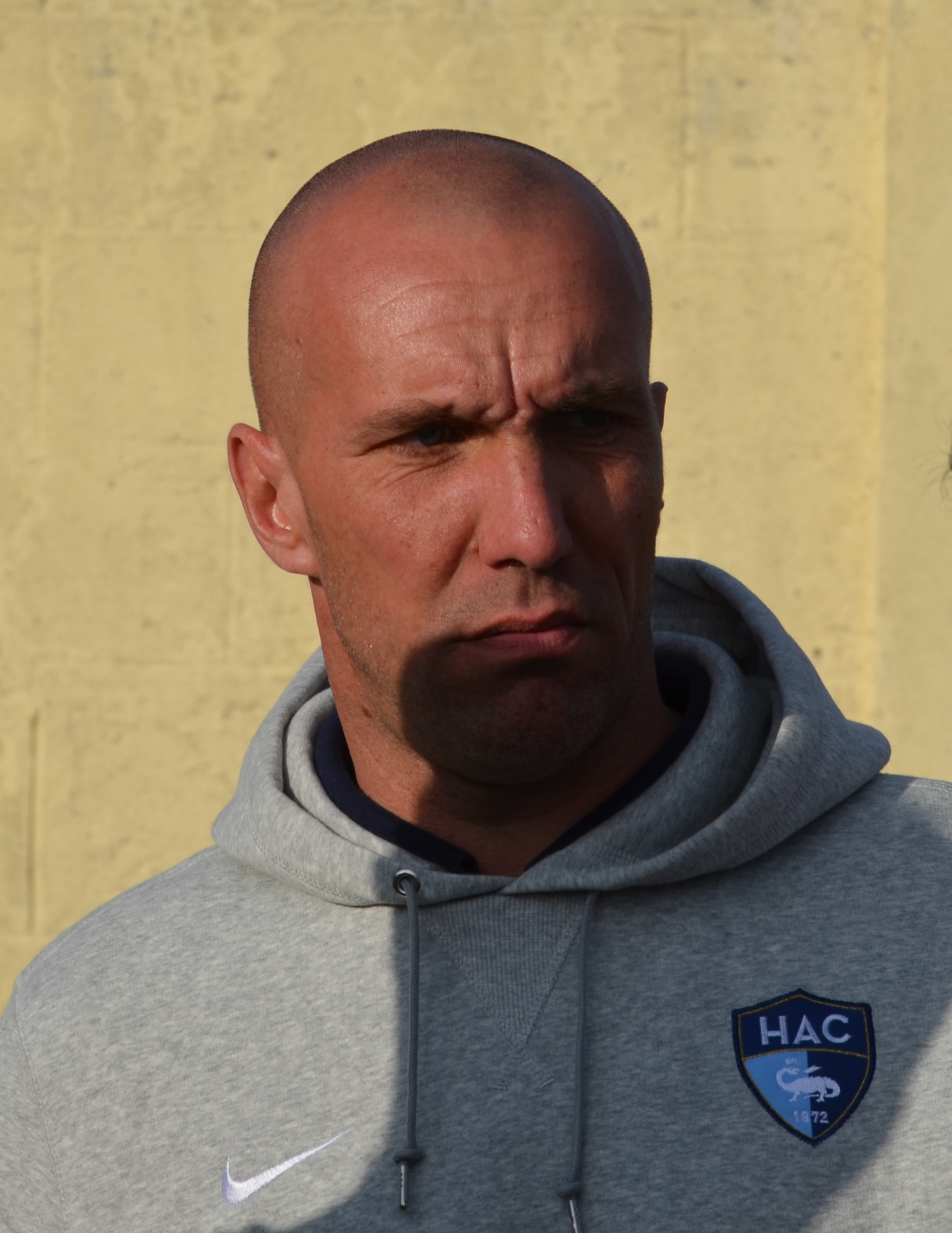
- Revault in 2015

Personal information
- Full name: Christophe Maurice Robert Revault
- Date of birth: 22 March 1972
- Place of birth: Paris, France
- Date of death: 6 May 2021 (aged 49)
- Place of death: Le Havre, France
- Height: 1.89 m (6 ft 2 in)
- Position: Goalkeeper

Senior career*
Years	Team	Apps	(Gls)
1992–1996	Le Havre	120	(0)
1996–1998	Paris Saint-Germain	28	(0)
1998–2000	Rennes	47	(0)
2000–2006	Toulouse	203	(0)
2006–2007	Rennes	0	(0)
2007–2010	Le Havre	77	(0)
Total		475	(0)
- * Club domestic league appearances and goals

Christophe Maurice Robert Revault (22 March 1972 – 6 May 2021) was a French professional footballer who played as a goalkeeper. After his playing career, he was the sporting director of his former club Le Havre.

== Early life ==
Christophe Maurice Robert Revault was born on 22 March 1972 in Paris.

== Playing career ==
=== Le Havre ===
Revault started his career with Le Havre, playing his first Ligue 1 game for them against Paris Saint-Germain at the Parc des Princes.

=== Paris Saint-Germain and Rennes ===
Revault would return to Paris to play for Paris Saint-Germain in 1997, as a replacement for Bernard Lama, who left for West Ham United. After a relatively disappointing spell with the Parisian club, Revault was snapped up by the Rennes manager Paul Le Guen, a former teammate of his at PSG, at the end of the 1997–98 season.

=== Toulouse ===
After two successful seasons with Rennes, Revault signed for Toulouse, then also playing in Ligue 1. In 2001, Toulouse were forced to be relegated down two divisions for financial reasons, but despite this Revault stuck with the club, helping them gain two successive promotions back to the top flight, picking up an award for Ligue 2's best goalkeeper of the 2002–03 season on his way. Upon his return to the top division, he was renowned as one of the finest goalkeepers plying their trade in France, although never being picked for France's national side.

=== Return to Brittany ===
Revault stayed with Toulouse until 2006, when the new manager, Élie Baup, announced that Nicolas Douchez was his first choice for the goalkeeper's jersey, prompting a return to Stade Rennais in August 2006, where he was now the second-choice goalkeeper, snapping at the heels of young Simon Pouplin.

On 6 January 2007, Revault played his first match in the colours of Rennes since returning to the club in the Round of 32 of the Coupe de France against National side Romorantin. It proved to be a bitter-sweet experience for Revault as Rennes suffered a shocking 3–1 loss after extra time in front of their own fans at the Stade de la Route de Lorient.

=== Back to Le Havre ===
In June 2007 it was announced that Revault would leave Rennes to return to Le Havre.

== Post-playing career ==
Revault retired from playing in 2010, but remained at Le Havre as a scout. He served as interim manager in two spells during 2012 and 2015, and served as their sporting director from December 2012 until his death in May 2021.

== Death ==
Revault was found dead in his family home in Le Havre, France on 6 May 2021 at the age of 49. The cause of death was not disclosed.

== Career statistics ==
Appearances and goals by club, season and competition
Club	Season	League			National cup		League cup		Europe		Total	
Club	Season	Division	Apps	Goals	Apps	Goals	Apps	Goals	Apps	Goals	Apps	Goals
Le Havre	1989–90	Division 2	3	0	0	0	—		—		3	0
Le Havre	1990–91	Division 2	1	0	0	0	—		—		1	0
Le Havre	1991–92	Division 1	0	0	0	0	—		—		0	0
Le Havre	1992–93	Division 1	1	0	0	0	—		—		1	0
Le Havre	1993–94	Division 1	1	0	0	0	—		—		1	0
Le Havre	1994–95	Division 1	38	0	3	0	4	0	—		41	0
Le Havre	1995–96	Division 1	38	0	2	0	3	0	—		43	0
Le Havre	1996–97	Division 1	38	0	1	0	1	0	—		40	0
Le Havre	Total		120	0	6	0	8	0	—		134	0
Paris Saint-Germain	1997–98	Division 1	28	0	1	0	0	0	8 (Note: Appearance(s) in UEFA Champions League)	0	37	0
Rennes	1998–99	Division 1	29	0	2	0	3	0	—		34	0
Rennes	1999–2000	Division 1	18	0	4	0	1	0	—		23	0
Rennes	Total		47	0	6	0	4	0	—		57	0
Toulouse	2000–01	Division 1	30	0	1	0	1	0	—		32	0
Toulouse	2001–02	National	38	0	1	0	1	0	—		45	35
Toulouse	2002–03	Ligue 2	34	0	3	0	1	0	—		38	0
Toulouse	2003–04	Ligue 1	38	0	3	0	1	0	—		42	0
Toulouse	2004–05	Ligue 1	38	0	2	0	1	0	—		41	0
Toulouse	2005–06	Ligue 1	25	0	0	0	1	0	—		26	0
Toulouse	Total		203	0	10	0	6	0	—		219	0
Rennes	2006–07	Ligue 1	0	0	1	0	0	0	—		1	0
Le Havre	2007–08	Ligue 2	38	0	1	0	2	0	—		41	0
Le Havre	2008–09	Ligue 1	33	0	0	0	1	0	—		34	0
Le Havre	2009–10	Ligue 2	6	0	1	0	0	0	—		7	0
Le Havre	Total		77	0	2	0	3	0	—		82	0
Career total			475	0	26	0	21	0	8	0	530	0

== Honours ==
Le Havre

- Division/Ligue 2: 1990–91, 2007–08

Paris Saint-Germain

- Coupe de France: 1997–98

Toulouse

- Ligue 2: 2002–03

Individual

- Ligue 2 UNFP Team of the Year: 2002–03, 2007–08
- Ligue 2 Goalkeeper of the Year: 2008
