= Nabil Taïder =

French-born Tunisian footballer (born 1983)

Personal information
- Full name: Nabil Sliti Taïder
- Date of birth: 26 May 1983 (age 43)
- Place of birth: Lavaur, Tarn, France
- Height: 1.82 m (6 ft 0 in)
- Position: Defensive midfielder

Youth career
- 1999–2001: Toulouse

Senior career*
Years	Team	Apps	(Gls)
2001–2008	Toulouse	145	(4)
2007	→ Lorient (loan)	11	(1)
2007–2008	→ Reims (loan)	24	(3)
2008–2009	Skoda Xanthi	29	(2)
2010	Sivasspor	8	(0)
2012	Étoile du Sahel	9	(0)
2013	Como	0	(0)
2013–2014	Parma	0	(0)
2013–2014	→ Gorica (loan)	2	(0)
2014	→ Lokomotiv Sofia (loan)	3	(0)
2014–2015	ND Gorica	11	(2)
2016–2017	Toulouse Rodéo	7	(0)
2017–2018	Blagnac	12	(2)
Total		261	(14)

International career
2004–2009	France U21	5	(0)
2009–2010	Tunisia	4	(1)
- * Club domestic league appearances and goals

Nabil Taïder (Arabic: نبيل تايدر; born 26 May 1983) is a former professional footballer who played as a defensive midfielder. Born in France, he made four international appearances for Tunisia, scoring one goal.

== Personal life ==
Taïder was born in France to a Tunisian father and an Algerian mother of Kabyle descent. His younger brother, Saphir Taïder, is also a professional footballer.

== Club career ==
Taïder began his career in the youth ranks of Toulouse FC. In 2001, he was promoted to the senior side and went on to be a key player in the midfield for the French side. In six years at the club Taïder appeared in 144 league matches and score 4 goals. During the 2006–07 season he was loaned to FC Lorient and appeared in 11 matches and score one goal. The following season he went on loan to Stade de Reims and was a key player for the club appearing in 24 league matches and scoring 3 goals. In 2008, he left France and joined Greece's Skoda Xanthi. In his first year with Skoda Xanthi, Taïder played in 24 matches and scored two goals. His second year in Greece saw him feature less frequently. As a result, he left the club during the winter transfer period.

On 8 January 2010, Sivasspor signed the Tunisian midfielder in a 1 1/2-year deal. While with Sivasspor, Taïder appeared in 8 league matches. He was released on 8 September 2010.

On 19 April 2011, Taider appeared in a reserve game for Championship side Bristol City. Nabil played an hour in a 2–1 defeat against Yeovil Town. Taïder joined Tunisian club Étoile Sportive du Sahel on 27 January 2012.

Taïder joined ND Gorica on 30 August 2013 in a temporary deal, the paper was completed on 5 September 2013. Taïder was signed by Parma F.C. from Calcio Como on a free transfer on 21 August 2013.

On 20 October 2014 Taïder re-joined Novi Gorica in a 1-year contract.

== International career ==
In 2005, at the age of 21, he attempted to join the Tunisia national football team for the 2006 FIFA World Cup, however FIFA deemed him ineligible as he had played for France U21, as opposed to the Tunisia national football team, before the age of 21. In 2009, he was finally able to debut for Tunisia. On 6 September 2009 he scored his first goal with Tunisia in a 2–2 draw against Nigeria.

=== International goal ===
Score and result list Tunisia goal tally first, score column indicates score after Taïder goal.

International goal scored by Nabil Taïder
No.	Date	Venue	Opponent	Score	Result	Competition
1	6 September 2009	Abuja Stadium, Abuja, Nigeria	Nigeria	1–1	2–2	2010 FIFA World Cup qualification (CAF)
