= Mathieu Puig =

French footballer (born 1978)

Personal information
- Date of birth: 22 May 1978 (age 48)
- Place of birth: Perpignan, France
- Height: 1.83 m (6 ft 0 in)
- Position: Defender

Senior career*
Years	Team	Apps	(Gls)
2000–2001	Toulouse	2	(0)
2001–2002	AS Angoulême	20	(0)
2002–2004	Toulouse	5	(0)
2004–2005	FC Rouen	30	(0)
2005–2008	Boulogne	69	(1)
2008–2011	Stade Lavallois	61	(1)
Total		187	(2)
- * Club domestic league appearances and goals

Mathieu Puig (born 22 May 1978) is a French former professional footballer who played in Ligue 1 for Toulouse.
