= Aurélien Mazel =

French footballer (born 1982)

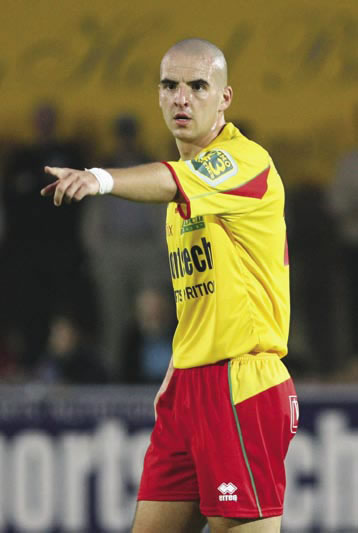

Personal information
- Date of birth: 24 November 1982 (age 43)
- Place of birth: Toulouse, France
- Height: 1.81 m (5 ft 11 1/2 in)
- Position: Defender

Team information
- Current team: Stirling Albion
- Number: 13

Senior career*
Years	Team	Apps	(Gls)
2000–2001	Toulouse B		
2001–2004	Toulouse	74	(0)
2004–2006	LB Châteauroux	9	(0)
2006–2007	Oostende		
2007–2008	AS Cannes		
2008–2014	US Colomiers		
2015–2016	Stirling Albion	20	(0)
- * Club domestic league appearances and goals as of 10:39, 17 March 2016 (UTC)

Aurélien Mazel (born 24 November 1982) was a French professional football player. He has recently retired from football. He had been most recently playing for Scottish part-time club Stirling Albion.

He played on the professional level in Ligue 1 for Toulouse FC and in Ligue 2 for Toulouse and LB Châteauroux.

He played one game in the 2004–05 UEFA Cup for Châteauroux.
