= Sylvain Didot =

French footballer (born 1975)

Personal information
- Date of birth: 8 October 1975 (age 51)
- Place of birth: Lannion, France
- Height: 1.74 m (5 ft 9 in)
- Position: Midfielder

Team information
- Current team: Granville (manager)

Youth career
- 1994–1997: Guingamp

Senior career*
Years	Team	Apps	(Gls)
1997–1998	GSI Pontivy	28	(1)
1998–2002	Brest	127	(11)
2002–2004	Toulouse	47	(2)
2004–2009	Reims	130	(8)
2009–2011	Avranches	60	(3)
2011–2013	Stade Briochin		

Managerial career
- 2011–2017: Stade Briochin
- 2017–2019: Guingamp (reserves)
- 2018: Guingamp (caretaker)
- 2019: Guingamp (assistant)
- 2019–2020: Guingamp
- 2021–: Granville
- * Club domestic league appearances and goals

Sylvain Didot (born 8 October 1975) is a French football manager and former player who currently manages Granville in French Championnat National 1.

He played professionally in Ligue 1 for Toulouse FC and in Ligue 2 for Toulouse and Stade de Reims.

== Club career ==
Born in Lannion, Didot was a youth player at Guingamp before moving to the CFA, first with GSI Pontivy and then with Brest. In 2003, he was part of the Brest side, which won promotion from the CFA, through being champions of Group D.

In the summer of 2002, Didot signed for Ligue 2 team Toulouse FC. On 16 May 2003, he scored the goal, which secured promotion for Toulouse to Ligue 1.

On 17 June 2004, with two years still remaining on his contract at Toulouse, Didot agreed to terminate the deal and signed for newly-promoted Ligue 2 side Stade de Reims. He was a regular player in four of his five seasons with Reims. In October 2006, Didot suffered a serious leg injury, which prevented him from playing for the rest of the season.

With Stade de Reims relegated to the Championnat National at the end of the 2008–09 season, Didot left the club and signed for newly promoted CFA side US Avranches on a two-year contract. He was made club captain in his last match on 29 May 2010.

In June 2011, Didot signed for Stade Briochin as player-manager, retiring from playing in 2013 to concentrate on managing the team.

== Managerial career ==
Didot's time as player-manager of Stade Briochin saw them achieve successive promotions from Ligue de Bretagne Division Supérieure Élite (seventh tier) to the CFA.

In April 2017, Didot was appointed coach of Guingamp reserves, replacing Coco Michel. He took joint caretaker control of the first team for a week at Guingamp in November 2018, following the sacking of Antoine Kombouaré. In May 2019, Didot was promoted to assistant manager by Patrice Lair. When Lair was sacked in September 2019, Didot once again took the caretaker role. He was given the job officially on 7 October 2019.

On 30 August 2020, he was sacked from coaching Guingamp, after two matches in the 2020–21 Ligue 2 season.

On 19 April 2021, Didot was announced as the new manager of Championnat National 2 side US Granville.

== Personal life ==
His younger brother, Étienne Didot, was also a professional footballer who played for Rennes, Toulouse and Guingamp. His son Mathéo Didot is also a professional footballer.

== Honours ==
=== Player ===
Brest

- Championnat de France Amateur: 1999–2000

Toulouse

- Ligue 2: 2002–03

=== Manager ===
Stade Briochin

- Ligue de Bretagne Division Honneur: 2012–13
