= Étienne Didot =

French footballer (born 1983)

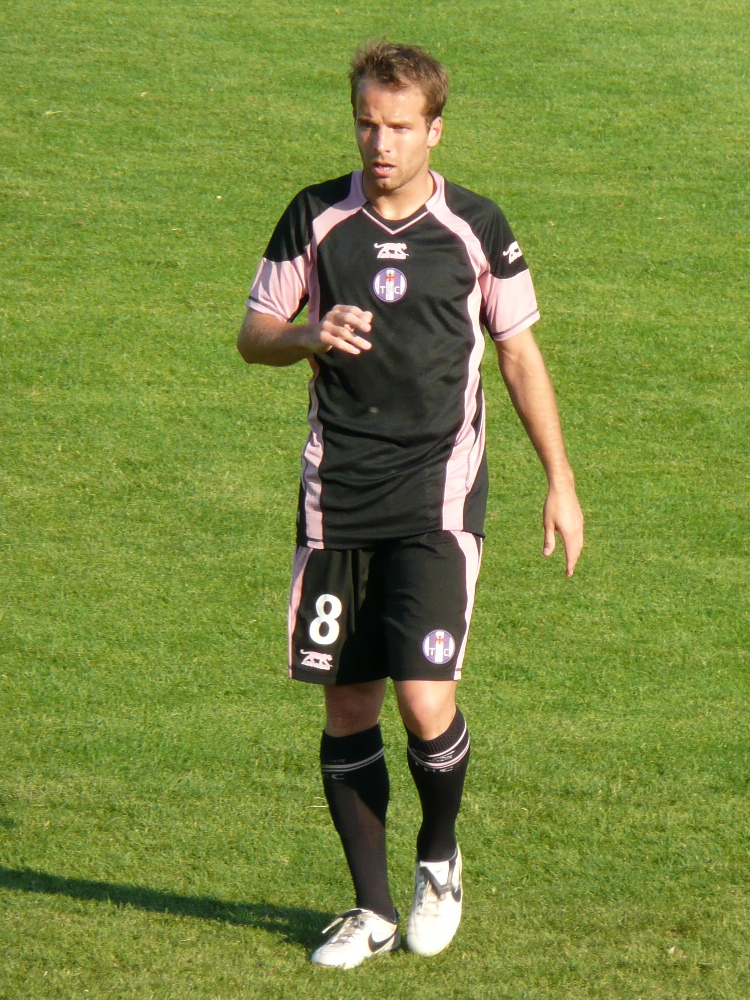

Personal information
- Full name: Étienne Didot
- Date of birth: 24 July 1983 (age 43)
- Place of birth: Paimpol, France
- Height: 1.75 m (5 ft 9 in)
- Position: Centre midfielder

Youth career
- 1990–1997: Stade Paimpolais
- 1997–2002: Rennes

Senior career*
Years	Team	Apps	(Gls)
2002–2008	Rennes	152	(5)
2008–2016	Toulouse	214	(9)
2016–2019	Guingamp	90	(4)
Total		456	(18)

International career
2003–2005	France U21	16	(0)
- * Club domestic league appearances and goals

Étienne Didot (born 24 July 1983) is a French former professional footballer who primarily played as a centre midfielder. Didot made over 400 appearances in Ligue 1 playing for Stade Rennais F.C., Toulouse FC, and En Avant de Guingamp.

== Club career ==
=== Rennes ===
Born in Paimpol, Côtes-d'Armor, Didot began his career playing for his hometown club Stade Paimpolais, before moving to Rennes in 1997. After successfully performing on the youth level, he was promoted to the senior squad during the winter break of the 2001–02 season and subsequently made his debut in a Coupe de France match against Le Havre. He made his league debut just four days later against Paris Saint-Germain coming on as a substitute in a 1–2 loss. Over the next two seasons, he was slowly integrated into the side appearing in 20 matches during the 2002–03 season and making 28 appearances during the 2003–04 season. The 2004–05 season was Didot's best season to date making 33 league appearances and also scoring his first league goal against RC Strasbourg in a 4–0 win. The club finished fourth in the league and qualified for the UEFA Cup, a first in the club's history.

Didot's 2005–06 league campaign was partially limited due to injury. After featuring in 19 of the first 20 league matches, he was forced out of the squad after separating his shoulder. He missed two months and did not play in the league again that season. In his last appearance before suffering the injury, he scored the game-winning goal against rivals Nantes in the Brittany derby.

After to the departure of Olivier Monterrubio to RC Lens in 2007, Didot was named captain of the squad for the 2007–08 season. However, despite being captain and pre-selected by Raymond Domenech to France's squad in August, the season was off par by Didot's standards, partly due to the firing of manager Pierre Dréossi, who was replaced by Guy Lacombe. Didot appeared on and off in the squad often, usually being dropped by Lacombe due to injuries and bad play. He made only 24 league appearances scoring two goals in his final season at Rennes.

=== Toulouse ===
On 18 June 2008, it was announced that Didot would transfer to Toulouse. The transfer fee was priced at €3 million. He made his debut in their opening league match against Olympique Lyonnais losing 0–3. However, Toulouse responded by going undefeated in their next seven matches. Toulouse finished the season fifth in the standings, despite finishing 17th the previous season, and also made it to the Coupe de France semi-finals with Didot making 34 total appearances and scoring two goals.

On 18 April 2014, Didot signed a new three-year deal with the le Téfécé side, keeping him contracted until June 2017.

=== Guingamp ===
On 1 July 2016, Didot joined French club En Avant de Guingamp.

== International career ==
Didot has earned caps with all of France's youth teams beginning with the U-15s. He was a regular with the under-21 squad making 16 appearances and scoring no goals.

== Personal life ==
Didot's brother Sylvain Didot, and his nephew Mathéo Didot also play football professionally.

Didot married a Chilean, María Paz Iribarne, in 2009 and they moved to Santiago, Chile. He became a gastronomic entrepreneur at the same time he has been in charge of Lille for Latin America. He has also competed in padel alongside the former Chile international Jean Beausejour.

== Honours ==
Guingamp

- Coupe de la Ligue runner-up: 2018–19
