= Christophe Avezac =

French midfielder (born 1977)

Personal information
- Full name: Cristophe Avezac
- Date of birth: March 12, 1977 (age 49)
- Place of birth: Saint-Gaudens, France
- Height: 1.76 m (5 ft 9 in)
- Position: Midfielder

Team information
- Current team: Comminges Saint-Gaudens Foot (coach)

Senior career*
Years	Team	Apps	(Gls)
1997–1999	Toulouse	2	(0)
1999–2000	→ Pau (loan)	25	(4)
2000–2001	Pau	29	(8)
2001–2002	Dijon	25	(10)
2002–2004	Toulouse	58	(5)
2004–2005	Metz	24	(0)
2005–2007	Dijon	58	(12)
2007–2008	Ajaccio	16	(0)
2008–2010	Vannes	24	(0)
2010–2015	Comminges Saint-Gaudens Foot (coach)	n/a	(n/a)
- * Club domestic league appearances and goals as of 18:01, 19 December 2008 (UTC)

Christophe Avezac (born March 12, 1977) is a French former midfielder currently coaching for Comminges Saint-Gaudens Foot.

== Career ==
Avezac previously played for Toulouse FC and FC Metz in Ligue 1 and Dijon FCO and AC Ajaccio in Ligue 2. (Note: Christophe Avezac – French league stats at LFP – also available in French (archived))
