= Ulrick Chavas =

French football midfielder (born 1980)

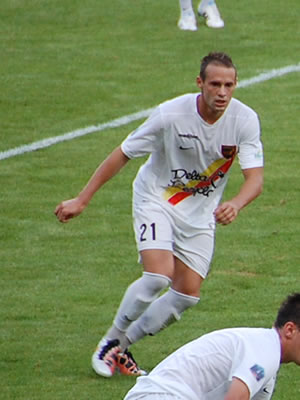
- Chavas playing for FC Martigues in 2011

Personal information
- Date of birth: 17 October 1980 (age 46)
- Place of birth: Firminy, France
- Height: 1.74 m (5 ft 9 in)
- Position: Midfielder

Senior career*
Years	Team	Apps	(Gls)
2002–2004	Toulouse	8	(0)
2003–2004	→ FC Sète (loan)	16	(4)
2004–2007	Nîmes	84	(8)
2007–2009	Vannes	40	(1)
2009–2010	AS Moulins	26	(0)
2010–2012	FC Martigues	61	(8)
2012–2013	ES Uzès Pont du Gard	18	(0)
Total		253	(21)
- * Club domestic league appearances and goals

Ulrick Chavas (born 17 October 1980) is a French former professional footballer who played as a midfielder.

Chavas previously played for Toulouse FC and Vannes OC in Ligue 2. (Note: Ulrick Chavas – French league stats at LFP – also available in French (archived))

== Honours ==
Vannes

- Coupe de la Ligue: runner-up 2008–09
