= Stéphane Lièvre =

French footballer (born 1972)

Stéphane Lievre
Personal information
- Date of birth: 3 October 1972 (age 54)
- Place of birth: Paris, France
- Height: 1.87 m (6 ft 2 in)
- Position: Defender

Senior career*
Years	Team	Apps	(Gls)
1992–1997	Caen	115	(4)
1997–2000	Nantes	59	(1)
2000–2006	Toulouse	132	(3)
Total		306	(8)
- * Club domestic league appearances and goals

Stéphane Lievre (born 3 October 1972) is a French football manager and former professional player he is the currently assistant manager Ligue 1 club of Toulouse.

Born in Paris, he played his entire career in France for three clubs: Stade Malherbe Caen, FC Nantes and Toulouse FC.
