= Geoffrey Doumeng =

French football midfielder (born 1980)

Personal information
- Full name: Geoffrey Doumeng
- Date of birth: 9 November 1980 (age 45)
- Place of birth: Narbonne, France
- Height: 1.68 m (5 ft 6 in)
- Position: Midfielder

Youth career
- Montpellier HSC

Senior career*
Years	Team	Apps	(Gls)
1999–2004	Montpellier HSC	73	(2)
2004–2005	AS Nancy	24	(1)
2005–2008	Valenciennes FC	26	(2)
2008–2011	RC Lens	31	(1)
2010–2011	→ Tours FC (loan)	16	(1)
2011–2012	Chonburi F.C.	6	(2)
2013	Phuket F.C.	28	(3)

International career
1995–1996	France U-16	12	(0)
1996–1997	France U-17	7	(1)
- * Club domestic league appearances and goals

Geoffrey Doumeng (born 9 November 1980) is a French football midfielder who has played in both France and Thailand.

== Honours ==
Montpellier

- UEFA Intertoto Cup: 1999
