= Albin Ebondo =

French footballer (born 1984)

Personal information
- Full name: Albin Ebondo
- Date of birth: 23 February 1984 (age 42)
- Place of birth: Marseille, France
- Height: 1.80 m (5 ft 11 in)
- Position: Right back

Youth career
- 1992–1993: ES Vieux Cyprès
- 1993–2000: Olympique de Marseille
- 2000–2001: Toulouse FC

Senior career*
Years	Team	Apps	(Gls)
2001–2010	Toulouse FC	183	(3)
2010–2012	Saint-Étienne	55	(1)
- * Club domestic league appearances and goals as of 01:33, 20 August 2016 (UTC)

Albin Ebondo (born 23 February 1984) is a French former footballer who plays as a defender.

On 18 June 2007, Ebondo signed an extension to his extant 2008 contract making him stay with the club until 2010.

For the first time in 2007, he took part in the France national team pre-selection.

In 2018, he followed all the summer preparation with the CFA (reserve) team of AS Saint Etienne (France), trained by Laurent Battles and he also played a match during this preparation. He is looking for a new club
