= Cédric Liabeuf =

French footballer (born 1979)

Personal information
- Date of birth: 5 August 1979 (age 47)
- Place of birth: Châteaurenard, France
- Height: 1.69 m (5 ft 7 in)
- Position: Midfielder

Senior career*
Years	Team	Apps	(Gls)
1997–2000	Auxerre B		
2000–2001	Romorantin		
2001–2003	Reims		
2003–2005	Le Mans	26	(0)
2005–2007	Brest	65	(7)
2007–2009	Guingamp	37	(0)
2009–2010	Vannes	32	(4)
2000–2013	Colmar		
2013–2014	Uzès Pont du Gard		
- * Club domestic league appearances and goals

Cédric Liabeuf (born 5 August 1979) is a French former professional footballer who played in Ligue 1 for Le Mans, in Ligue 2 for Reims, Le Mans, Brest, Guingamp and Vannes. He also played lower-division football for Auxerre B, Romorantin, Colmar, Uzès Pont du Gard, Bagnols Pont, and Uchaud.
