= Anthony Braizat =

French football coach (born 1977)

Personal information
- Date of birth: 16 August 1977 (age 49)
- Place of birth: Saint-Raphaël, Var, France
- Height: 1.76 m (5 ft 9 in)
- Position: Midfielder

Senior career*
Years	Team	Apps	(Gls)
1995–1998	Cannes	4	(0)
1998–2002	Lyon	0	(0)
1999–2000	→ Laval (loan)	19	(0)
2000–2001	→ Etoile-Carouge (loan)	13	(2)
2002–2005	Toulouse	36	(9)
2005–2007	Cannes	51	(2)
2007–2008	ES Fréjus	31	(6)
2008–2010	Servette	45	(4)
Total		191	(23)

Managerial career
- 2016: Servette
- 2017–2019: Yverdon-Sport
- 2020–2022: Stade Nyonnais
- 2022–2023: Stade Lausanne Ouchy
- 2024–2026: Neuchâtel Xamax
- * Club domestic league appearances and goals

Anthony Braizat (born 16 August 1977) is a French football manager and former player.

== Coaching career ==
Braizat formally joined the Servette academy staff in June 2010, initially coaching the U13s, supporting the U15s and providing attacking coaching to the U21 side.

It was announced in January 2016 that he was the new head coach of Servette.

In March 2017, Braizat took up the role of head coach at Yverdon-Sport.

In January 2020, Braizat was appointed the head coach of Stade Nyonnais following Ricardo Dionisio's departure from the role. His contract was initially set to run until the end of the 2019–20 season with the possibility of an extension. The season, however, was cancelled following the outbreak of COVID-19 in Switzerland. Nyon proceeded to confirm that Braizat will continue to coach the club when the league restarts.

On 25 May 2022, Braizat was appointed the head coach of Stade Lausanne Ouchy for the 2022–23 season. On 6 June 2023, SLO were promoted to the Swiss Super League for the first time in history after defeating FC Sion 6–2 on aggregate in the two-legged promotion relegation play-off. He was dismissed on 13 November 2023, following five games without a win and two 5–2 defeats in a row in his last two games. Thus, he only lasted just under four months as coach in the Swiss top flight, managing only two wins in 14 games.

On 24 December 2024, he was appointed manager of Neuchâtel Xamax.
