= Cédric Fauré =

French footballer (born 1979)

Personal information
- Date of birth: 14 February 1979 (age 47)
- Place of birth: Toulouse, France
- Height: 1.87 m (6 ft 2 in)
- Position: Striker

Team information
- Current team: Union Namur (manager)

Youth career
- 2001–2002: Toulouse

Senior career*
Years	Team	Apps	(Gls)
2002–2004	Toulouse	72	(30)
2004–2005	Guingamp	32	(13)
2005–2006	Istres	21	(6)
2006	→ Le Mans (loan)	14	(2)
2006–2008	Reims	72	(31)
2008	Le Havre	10	(1)
2009–2012	Reims	84	(27)
2012–2014	Guingamp	33	(4)
2014–2015	Charleroi	49	(14)
2015	Union SG	18	(11)
2016	Antwerp	8	(1)
2016–2017	Union SG	15	(1)
Total		428	(141)
- * Club domestic league appearances and goals

Cédric Fauré (born 14 February 1979) is a French former professional footballer who played as a striker. He is manager of Belgian club Union Namur.

== Playing career ==
Born in Toulouse and raised in the Haute-Garonne village Miremont, Fauré played amateur football and worked for a consumer electronics company before making his professional debut with Toulouse FC in 2002. In his first season, he scored 20 goals which made him Ligue 2 top scorer, helping his club win the league and achieve promotion to Ligue 1. The next season, despite not playing very often, he still managed to score 10 goals.

He then transferred to Guingamp, hoping to get more playing time. At Guingamp, he scored 13 goals in 32 league games in his only season there.

He moved to Istres and, six months later, was loaned to Le Mans where he remained Brazilian striker Grafite's substitute.

in the summer of 2006, he signed with Reims. He settled quickly and his numerous goals made him a fans' favourite.

After the club's failure to achieve promotion to Ligue 1, he announces he his departure for Le Havre, recently promoted to Ligue 1, in April 2008.

On 19 December 2008, Fauré returned to Reims. The club was relegated to third-tier National in May 2009. In his second stint at Reims, he achieved two promotions in three years. During the season 2009–10, he finished top scorer of National. Two years later, he became Ligue 2 top scorer for the second time, scoring 15 goals and helping the club from Champagne achieve promotion to Ligue 1, for the first time since 1979. Over the summer of 2012, his contract expired and no agreement was found with the management of Reims.

Fauré returned to Guingamp, still in Ligue 2 at that time, for a second spell. The following season, he contributed 4 goals in 29 games to the promotion of the Breton club to the Ligue 1, which had been absent from the division since 2004. However, in the top-flight, he was excluded from a regular first-team place and on 31 January 2014, moved to Belgian side Sporting Charleroi on a six-month loan deal.

In summer 2015, Fauré joined another Belgian side, Union SG.

He retired in the summer 2017.

== Managerial career ==
In 2020, Cédric Fauré starts is career as a trainer in Haute-Garonne in AS Tournefeuille.

In 2022, after a short period coaching FC Mulhouse in Alsace, He comes back in Belgium as head coach of Union Namur in Second Amateur Division (fourth-tier of Belgian football).

On 14 May 2023, Fauré brought his club promotion to Belgian National Division 1 after finishing runner-up, due to Warnant winning the title but fail obtain a licence.

== Honours ==
=== Player ===
Toulouse

- Ligue 2: 2003

=== Manager ===
Union Namur

- Belgian Division 2: 2022–23 (Runner-up and promotion)

Individual

- Ligue 2 top scorer: 2003, 2012
- National top scorer: 2010
