= Stade du Ray =

Football stadium in Nice, France

Coordinates: 43°43′23.98″N 7°15′31.52″E

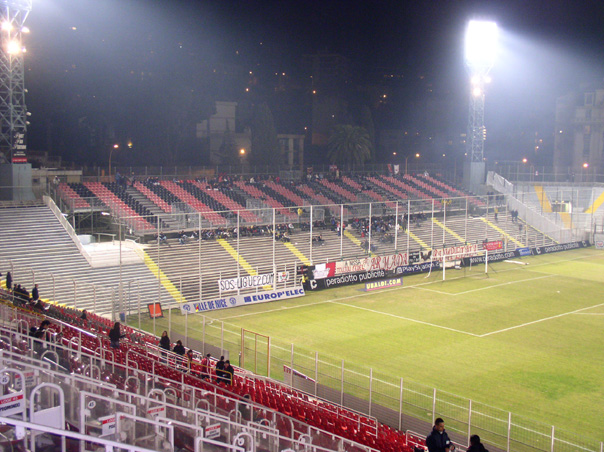
- Interactive map of Stade du Ray
- Full name: Stade Municipal du Ray
- Location: Nice, France
- Owner: City of Nice
- Capacity: 17,415
- Surface: Grass

Construction
- Built: 1897
- Opened: 30 January 1927
- Renovated: 1948, 1979, 1992, 1997
- Closed: 2013
- Demolished: 2017

Tenant
- OGC Nice (1927–2013)

Stade Municipal du Ray was a football stadium in Nice, France. It was the home of OGC Nice since it opened in 1927 and had a capacity of 17,415. It was conveniently located in the centre of the city, but suffered from its old structure and small capacity. The red and black colored stadium was mostly used for football. A new stadium was planned to be built in the Lingostière side, but the project was cancelled in 2006. The stadium was replaced by the Allianz Riviera in September 2013.
