= 2002–03 Ligue 2 =

64th season of the second-tier football league in France

Ligue 2
- Season: 2002–03

The Ligue 2 season 2002–03, organised by the LFP was won by Toulouse FC and saw the promotions of Toulouse FC, Le Mans UC72 and FC Metz, whereas AS Beauvais, ES Wasquehal and Stade de Reims were relegated to National.

== 20 participating teams ==
- Amiens
- Beauvais
- Caen
- Châteauroux
- Clermont
- Créteil
- Grenoble
- Gueugnon
- Istres
- Laval
- Le Mans
- Lorient
- Metz
- Nancy
- Niort
- Reims
- Saint-Étienne
- Toulouse
- Valence
- Wasquehal

== League table ==
Pos	Team	Pld	W	D	L	GF	GA	GD	Pts	Promotion or Relegation
1	Toulouse (C, P)	38	21	9	8	50	24	+26	72	Promotion to Ligue 1
2	Le Mans (P)	38	18	14	6	49	33	+16	68	Promotion to Ligue 1
3	Metz (P)	38	19	10	9	52	29	+23	67	Promotion to Ligue 1
4	Lorient	38	18	11	9	43	29	+14	65	
5	Châteauroux	38	16	12	10	40	35	+5	60	
6	Niort	38	14	11	13	44	40	+4	53	
7	Caen	38	12	16	10	45	40	+5	52	
8	Laval	38	15	7	16	41	42	−1	52	
9	Saint-Étienne	38	12	15	11	34	30	+4	51	
10	Amiens	38	12	13	13	30	33	−3	49	
11	Gueugnon	38	12	13	13	35	42	−7	49	
12	Grenoble	38	11	14	13	39	29	+10	47	
13	Valence	38	11	13	14	38	42	−4	46	
14	Clermont	38	13	7	18	39	51	−12	46	
15	Nancy	38	10	13	15	30	47	−17	43	
16	Istres	38	10	13	15	32	53	−21	43	
17	Créteil	38	8	18	12	39	42	−3	42	
18	Beauvais (R)	38	9	10	19	20	32	−12	37	Relegation to Championnat National [fr]
19	Wasquehal (R)	38	6	18	14	26	39	−13	36	Relegation to Championnat National [fr]
20	Reims (R)	38	6	17	15	31	45	−14	35	Relegation to Championnat National [fr]

Source: Ligue 2
(C) Champions; (P) Promoted; (R) Relegated

== Results ==
Home \ Away	AMI	BEA	CAE	CHA	CLE	CRE	GRE	GUE	IST	LAV	MFC	LOR	MET	NAL	NRT	REI	STE	TFC	VLN	WAS
Amiens		2–0	1–0	0–2	1–0	2–0	1–1	0–0	1–1	1–0	0–1	0–2	1–0	0–0	1–0	0–1	1–0	3–1	3–0	1–2
Beauvais	1–1		1–2	0–1	1–0	0–0	0–1	1–0	2–0	1–2	0–2	0–1	1–2	1–1	0–2	1–0	3–0	0–0	0–0	0–0
Caen	2–0	0–0		4–1	1–1	2–2	0–0	3–0	1–0	0–0	1–1	0–0	1–0	2–0	0–1	1–1	0–0	0–2	3–1	2–1
Châteauroux	1–1	1–0	2–1		1–0	2–0	0–0	2–1	1–0	0–2	1–1	3–1	0–0	1–0	4–0	3–1	1–1	0–0	1–1	2–2
Clermont	1–1	1–0	2–3	1–3		1–2	2–0	0–0	1–1	3–0	1–0	2–1	2–1	3–1	0–1	3–2	1–0	0–1	1–0	1–0
Créteil	1–1	1–0	1–1	0–2	0–1		0–0	2–2	5–0	1–1	2–2	3–1	1–1	2–0	0–0	1–1	0–0	2–2	0–1	2–1
Grenoble	0–0	0–2	2–2	0–0	6–1	3–0		2–0	5–0	0–1	0–0	0–0	0–0	0–1	1–0	4–1	1–0	1–1	1–2	3–0
Gueugnon	1–1	2–0	1–1	2–2	2–0	2–2	1–0		1–1	2–1	0–1	1–0	0–2	2–2	1–0	2–2	0–2	0–1	2–0	0–2
Istres	2–0	0–0	0–4	0–2	1–1	1–0	3–1	1–0		3–1	1–0	1–1	1–1	2–0	1–3	0–0	0–0	0–4	2–2	1–0
Laval	1–0	2–0	3–2	1–0	1–3	1–0	1–1	2–0	3–1		1–1	0–1	1–1	0–1	2–1	1–0	1–0	1–1	1–2	1–0
Le Mans	1–1	1–0	2–0	1–0	3–0	2–1	1–0	3–1	1–0	1–1		0–1	1–0	3–0	1–0	1–1	2–2	2–1	2–0	0–0
Lorient	1–0	3–0	2–0	2–0	0–0	0–0	0–2	0–1	1–0	2–1	3–4		2–0	1–0	1–0	3–0	1–1	1–0	1–0	0–0
Metz	1–0	1–0	4–0	2–0	2–1	1–0	1–0	4–0	4–1	2–1	4–0	2–1		4–0	2–1	0–0	1–1	0–0	1–2	2–0
Nancy	1–0	0–2	0–0	1–0	1–0	2–3	1–1	1–1	0–2	2–1	2–2	0–0	1–2		0–0	2–1	1–0	3–2	2–2	0–0
Niort	2–0	0–1	1–1	4–0	3–2	1–0	1–0	0–1	1–3	2–1	1–1	1–1	2–0	3–2		0–0	3–0	2–0	2–2	1–1
Reims	1–1	0–0	1–2	0–1	0–0	0–0	0–1	1–1	2–2	3–2	1–2	1–3	0–2	1–0	1–1		1–0	0–1	2–0	4–1
Saint-Étienne	4–1	1–0	2–1	0–0	3–1	1–1	2–1	0–3	3–0	1–0	0–0	1–1	1–1	0–1	2–0	0–0		1–0	2–0	2–0
Toulouse	1–2	2–0	2–0	1–0	2–1	0–0	2–0	0–1	1–0	2–1	2–0	3–1	3–0	0–0	4–1	2–0	1–0		3–1	1–0
Valence	0–1	0–0	0–0	4–0	4–1	2–1	1–0	0–1	0–0	1–0	2–2	1–1	3–1	2–0	2–2	0–0	0–0	0–1		0–1
Wasquehal	0–0	0–2	2–2	0–0	2–0	2–3	1–1	0–0	0–0	0–1	2–1	1–2	0–0	1–1	1–1	1–1	1–1	0–0	1–0	

Source: Ligue 2
Legend: Blue = home team win; Yellow = draw; Red = away team win.

== Top goalscorers ==
Rank	Player	Club	Goals
1	(France) Cédric Fauré	Toulouse	20
2	(France) Guillaume Deschamps	Châteauroux	15
2	(Gabon) Daniel Cousin	Le Mans	15
4	(Togo) Emmanuel Adebayor	Metz	13
5	(Togo) Robert Malm	Grenoble	12
5	(Ivory Coast) Élie Kroupi	Lorient	12
5	(France) Cédric Liabeuf	Reims	12
8	(France) Sébastien Mazure	Caen	11
8	(Brazil) (France) Rogerio Moreira	Valence	11
10	(France) Guilherme Mauricio	Laval	10
10	(Argentina) Sergio Rojas	Grenoble	10
10	(France) Patrice Loko	Lorient	10

== Attendances ==
#	Club	Average
1	Saint-Étienne	14,871
2	Metz	13,115
3	Toulouse	10,273
4	Caen	9,599
5	Lorient	7,718
6	Le Mans	7,399
7	La Berrichonne	7,215
8	Amiens	6,911
9	Clermont	6,507
10	Reims	5,702
11	Nancy	5,593
12	Grenoble	5,133
13	Chamois niortais	4,319
14	Valence	3,648
15	Stade lavallois	3,464
16	Beauvais	3,296
17	Gueugnon	3,090
18	Créteil	2,148
19	Istres	1,725
20	Wasquehal	1,526
