= 2002–03 Coupe de la Ligue =

French League Cup

Tournament details
- Country: France
- Dates: 11 October 2002 – 17 May 2003
- Teams: 44

Final positions
- Champions: Monaco (1st title)
- Runners-up: Sochaux

Tournament statistics
- Matches played: 43
- Goals scored: 120 (2.79 per match)
- Top goal scorer: Six players (3 goals)

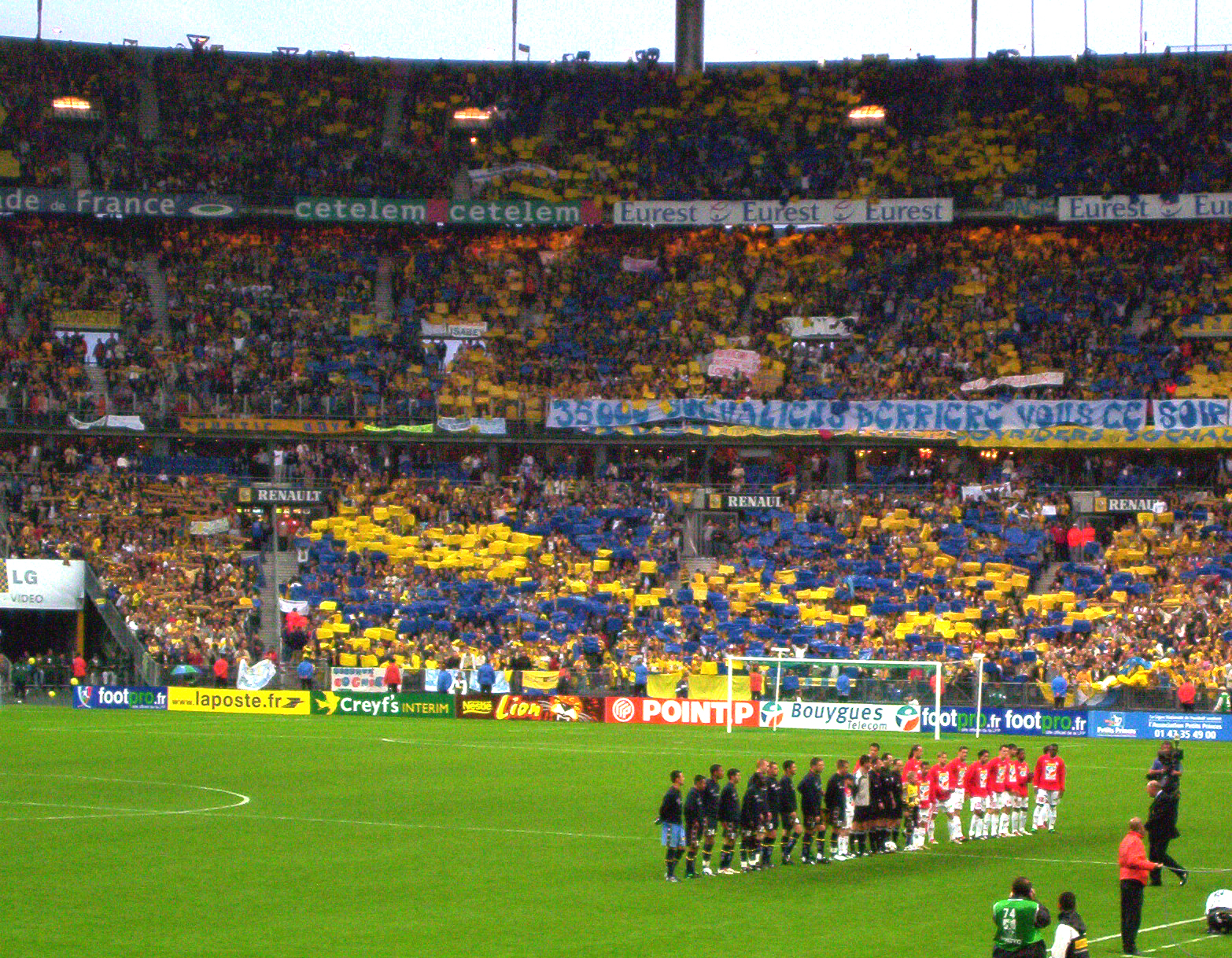
Final match of the 2002-2003 French league cup competition

The 2002–03 Coupe de la Ligue was the 9th edition of the French league cup competition. The competition was organised by the Ligue de Football Professionnel and was open to the 40 professional clubs in France that are managed by the organisation, alongside a further four clubs.

== First round ==
The matches were played on 11 October and 10 December 2002.

Team 1	Score	Team 2
Martigues	3–2 (a.e.t.)	Reims
Amiens	0–1 (a.e.t.)	Gueugnon
Wasquehal	3–1	Laval
Metz	0–0 (a.e.t.) (4–2 p)	Niort
Istres	2–1 (a.e.t.)	Lorient
Nîmes	2–0	Angers
Beauvais	2–1 (a.e.t.)	Caen
Saint-Étienne	3–2	Toulouse
Créteil	1–0	Clermont
Le Mans	3–0	Valence
Grenoble	2–0	Cannes
Nancy	3–0 (Note: Match was initially played on 6 November, where Nancy won 2–1, but was annulled as 2 Nancy players were ineligible)	Chateauroux

== Second round ==
The matches were played on 7, 8 December 2002 and 18 January 2003.

Team 1	Score	Team 2
Istres	1–2	Lille
Beauvais	3–3 (a.e.t.) (3–1 p)	Lens
Sochaux	3–0	Ajaccio
Nîmes	1–1 (a.e.t.) (4–2 p)	Sedan
Le Mans	1–0	Grenoble
Créteil	1–0	Nice
Martigues	0–1	Metz
Montpellier	1–2	Bordeaux
Gueugnon	1–1 (a.e.t.) (5–4 p)	Rennes
Guingamp	1–0	Strasbourg
Marseille	5–1	Troyes
Lyon	2–0	Bastia
Monaco	1–0	Auxerre
Saint-Étienne	1–0 (a.e.t.)	Le Havre
Paris Saint-Germain	2–3	Nantes
Nancy	1–0	Wasquehal

== Round of 16 ==
The matches were played on 18, 19 January and 14 February 2003.

Team 1	Score	Team 2
Sochaux	3–3 (a.e.t.) (5–3 p)	Lyon
Marseille	4–0	Créteil
Saint-Étienne	3–2	Le Mans
Guingamp	3–3 (a.e.t.) (2–4 p)	Nantes
Metz	1–0	Bordeaux
Beauvais	0–1	Monaco
Lille	0–0 (a.e.t.) (3–1 p)	Nîmes
Gueugnon	3–2 (a.e.t.)	Nancy

== Quarter-finals ==
4 March 2003	Saint-Étienne	0–2	Marseille	Saint-Étienne
			Fernandão 31'; Sakho 50'	Stadium: Stade Geoffroy Guichard; Attendance: 32,767; Referee: Pascal Garibian

5 March 2003	Sochaux	1–0 (a.e.t.)	Lille	Montbéliard
	Monsoreau 104'			Stadium: Stade Auguste Bonal; Attendance: 16,122; Referee: Éric Poulat

5 March 2003	Nantes	0–2	Metz	Nantes
			Adebayor 81' (pen.), 85'	Stadium: Stade de la Beaujoire; Attendance: 26,258; Referee: Pascal Vileo

5 March 2003	Gueugnon	0–5	Monaco	Gueugnon
			El Fakiri 14'; Squillaci 39'; Nonda 47'; Gallardo 74'; Lanteri 83'	Stadium: Stade Jean Laville; Attendance: 7,736; Referee: Damien Ledentu

== Semi-finals ==
15 April 2003	Sochaux	3–2 (a.e.t.)	Metz	Montbéliard
	Frau 46', 69'; Monsoreau 98'		Proment 27'; Niang 87'	Stadium: Stade Auguste Bonal; Attendance: 19,331; Referee: Laurent Duhamel

16 April 2003	Marseille	0–1	Monaco	Marseille
			Pršo 49'	Stadium: Stade Vélodrome; Attendance: 44,201; Referee: Alain Sars

== Final ==
The final was held on 17 May 2003 at the Stade de France, Saint-Denis.

17 May 2003
20:45

Monaco	4–1	Sochaux
Giuly 56', 77'; Squillaci 60'; Pršo 66'		Saveljić 87' (pen.)

Stade de France, Saint-Denis
Attendance: 75,379
Referee: Damien Ledentu
