= 2000–01 RC Strasbourg season =

Strasbourg
2000–01 season
- President: Patrick Proisy
- Head coach: Claude Le Roy (until November); Yvon Pouliquen (from November)
- Stadium: Stade de la Meinau
- Division 1: 18th (relegated)
- Coupe de France: Winners
- Coupe de la Ligue: Round of 32
- Top goalscorer: League: Péguy Luyindula (7); All: Péguy Luyindula (13)
- Average home league attendance: 13,842

The 2000–01 season was the 95th season in the existence of RC Strasbourg and the club's ninth consecutive season in the top flight of French football. In addition to the domestic league, Strasbourg competed in this season's edition of the Coupe de France and Coupe de la Ligue. The season covered the period from 1 July 2000 to 30 June 2001.

== Season summary ==
Despite winning the Coupe de France, Strasbourg were relegated in bottom place.

== First-team squad ==
Squad at end of season

Note: Flags indicate national team as defined under FIFA eligibility rules; some limited exceptions apply. Players may hold more than one non-FIFA nationality.

| No. | Pos. | Nation | Player |
|---|---|---|---|
| 1 | GK | FRA | Thierry Debès |
| 2 | DF | CMR | Pierre Njanka |
| 3 | DF | FRA | Jean-Christophe Devaux |
| 5 | DF | FRA | Teddy Bertin |
| 6 | MF | FRA | Pascal Johansen |
| 7 | FW | MLI | Mamadou Bagayoko |
| 8 | FW | FRA | Péguy Luyindula |
| 9 | FW | YUG | Danijel Ljuboja |
| 10 | MF | FRA | Corentin Martins |
| 11 | FW | FRA | Jacques Rémy |
| 12 | MF | ARG | Diego Garay |
| 13 | DF | FRA | Valérien Ismaël |
| 15 | FW | CMR | Joseph N'Do |
| 16 | GK | FRA | Christophe Eggimann |
| 17 | MF | MAR | Gharib Amzine |

| No. | Pos. | Nation | Player |
|---|---|---|---|
| 18 | DF | POR | Nuno Mendes |
| 19 | FW | AUT | Mario Haas |
| 20 | MF | MLI | Vincent Doukantié |
| 21 | MF | ALG | Rafik Mezriche |
| 22 | MF | SUI | Fabrice Ehret |
| 23 | DF | SEN | Habib Beye |
| 24 | MF | FRA | Yannick Fischer |
| 25 | MF | FRA | Stéphane Roda |
| 26 | MF | FRA | Pascal Camadini |
| 27 | FW | POL | Grégory Spiewak |
| 28 | DF | MLI | Cédric Kanté |
| 29 | MF | FRA | Yacine Abdessadki |
| 32 | GK | PAR | José Luis Chilavert |
| 33 | FW | DEN | Denni Conteh |

=== Left club during season ===
Note: Flags indicate national team as defined under FIFA eligibility rules; some limited exceptions apply. Players may hold more than one non-FIFA nationality.

| No. | Pos. | Nation | Player |
|---|---|---|---|
| 4 | MF | FRA | Brahim Hemdani (to Marseille) |
| 13 | FW | ARG | Gonzalo Belloso (on loan to Cruz Azul) |

| No. | Pos. | Nation | Player |
|---|---|---|---|
| 14 | DF | SEN | Pape Malick Diop (to Neuchâtel Xamax) |

== Competitions ==
Win Draw Loss

=== Overall record ===
| Competition | First match | Last match | Starting round | Final position | Record | | | | | | | |
| Competition | First match | Last match | Starting round | Final position | Pld | W | D | L | GF | GA | GD | Win % |
|---|---|---|---|---|---|---|---|---|---|---|---|---|
| Division 1 | 28 July 2000 | 19 May 2001 | Matchday 1 | 18th | 34 | 7 | 8 | 19 | 28 | 61 | −33 | 20.59 |
| Coupe de France | 21 January 2001 | 26 May 2001 | Round of 64 | Winners | 6 | 5 | 1 | 0 | 12 | 2 | +10 | 83.33 |
| Coupe de la Ligue | 7 January 2001 | | Round of 32 | Round of 32 | 1 | 0 | 1 | 0 | 2 | 2 | +0 | 0.00 |
| Total | | | | | 41 | 12 | 10 | 19 | 42 | 65 | −23 | 29.27 |

Source: Competitions

=== Division 1 ===
==== League table ====
| Pos | Team | Pld | W | D | L | GF | GA | GD | Pts | Qualification or relegation |
|---|---|---|---|---|---|---|---|---|---|---|
| 14 | Lens | 34 | 9 | 13 | 12 | 37 | 39 | −2 | 40 | |
| 15 | Marseille | 34 | 11 | 7 | 16 | 31 | 40 | −9 | 40 | |
| 16 | Toulouse (R) | 34 | 9 | 10 | 15 | 34 | 49 | −15 | 37 | Administratively relegated to Championnat National (Note: Toulouse was administratively relegated to Championnat National by the DNCG due to financial difficulties.) |
| 17 | Saint-Étienne (R) | 34 | 8 | 10 | 16 | 42 | 56 | −14 | 34 | Relegation to French Division 2 |
| 18 | Strasbourg (R) | 34 | 7 | 8 | 19 | 28 | 61 | −33 | 29 | UEFA Cup first round and relegation to French Division 2 (Note: Strasbourg was qualified for the 2001–02 UEFA Cup as winners of the 2000–01 Coupe de France.) |

Source: Ligue 1
Rules for classification: 1) points; 2) goal difference; 3) number of goals scored.
(R) Relegated

==== Results summary ====
| Overall | | | | | | | | Home | | | | | | Away | | | | | |
| Pld | W | D | L | GF | GA | GD | Pts | W | D | L | GF | GA | GD | W | D | L | GF | GA | GD |
|---|---|---|---|---|---|---|---|---|---|---|---|---|---|---|---|---|---|---|---|
| 34 | 7 | 8 | 19 | 28 | 61 | −33 | 29 | 5 | 3 | 9 | 17 | 34 | −17 | 2 | 5 | 10 | 11 | 27 | −16 |

Source: French Division 1

==== Results by round ====
| Round | 1 | 2 | 3 | 4 | 5 | 6 | 7 | 8 | 9 | 10 | 11 | 12 | 13 | 14 | 15 | 16 | 17 | 18 | 19 | 20 | 21 | 22 | 23 | 24 | 25 | 26 | 27 | 28 | 29 | 30 | 31 | 32 | 33 | 34 |
|---|---|---|---|---|---|---|---|---|---|---|---|---|---|---|---|---|---|---|---|---|---|---|---|---|---|---|---|---|---|---|---|---|---|---|
| Ground | A | H | H | A | H | A | H | A | H | A | H | A | H | A | H | A | H | A | A | H | A | H | A | H | A | H | A | H | A | H | A | H | A | H |
| Result | L | L | L | L | W | L | L | W | W | D | L | L | D | D | L | W | L | D | L | D | L | L | L | D | D | W | L | L | D | W | L | W | L | L |
| Position | 16 | 18 | 18 | 18 | 17 | 18 | 18 | 18 | 17 | 17 | 17 | 17 | 17 | 17 | 17 | 17 | 17 | 17 | 18 | 18 | 18 | 18 | 18 | 18 | 18 | 18 | 18 | 18 | 18 | 18 | 18 | 18 | 18 | 18 |

Source: French Division 1
A = Away; H = Home; W = Win; D = Draw; L = Loss

==== Matches ====
| 28 July 2000 1 | Paris Saint-Germain | 3–1 | Strasbourg | Paris |
| --:-- CEST (UTC+2) | | | | Stadium: Parc des Princes |

| 5 August 2000 2 | Strasbourg | 0–4 | Lille | Strasbourg |
| --:-- CEST (UTC+2) | | | | Stadium: Stade de la Meinau |

| 12 August 2000 3 | Strasbourg | 1–3 | Monaco | Strasbourg |
| --:-- CEST (UTC+2) | | | | Stadium: Stade de la Meinau |

| 19 August 2000 4 | Rennes | 3–0 | Strasbourg | Rennes |
| --:-- CEST (UTC+2) | | | | Stadium: Roazhon Park |

| 26 August 2000 5 | Strasbourg | 3–2 | Sedan | Strasbourg |
| --:-- CEST (UTC+2) | | | | Stadium: Stade de la Meinau |

| 6 September 2000 6 | Metz | 1–0 | Strasbourg | Metz |
| --:-- CEST (UTC+2) | | | | Stadium: Stade Saint-Symphorien |

| 9 September 2000 7 | Strasbourg | 1–4 | Bastia | Strasbourg |
| --:-- CEST (UTC+2) | | | | Stadium: Stade de la Meinau |

| 16 September 2000 8 | Troyes | 0–1 | Strasbourg | Troyes |
| --:-- CEST (UTC+2) | | | | Stadium: Stade de l'Aube; Attendance: 16,856; Referee: Bruno Derrien |

| 23 September 2000 9 | Strasbourg | 3–2 | Saint-Étienne | Strasbourg |
| --:-- CEST (UTC+2) | | | | Stadium: Stade de la Meinau |

| 30 September 2000 10 | Lens | 0–0 | Strasbourg | Lens |
| --:-- CEST (UTC+2) | | | | Stadium: Stade Bollaert-Delelis |

| 14 October 2000 11 | Strasbourg | 0–5 | Nantes | Strasbourg |
| --:-- CEST (UTC+2) | | | | Stadium: Stade de la Meinau |

| 21 October 2000 12 | Guingamp | 2–1 | Strasbourg | Guingamp |
| --:-- CEST (UTC+2) | | | | Stadium: Stade de Roudourou |

| 28 October 2000 13 | Strasbourg | 1–1 | Marseille | Strasbourg |
| --:-- CEST (UTC+2) | | | | Stadium: Stade de la Meinau |

| 4 November 2000 14 | Toulouse | 0–0 | Strasbourg | Toulouse |
| --:-- CET (UTC+1) | | | | Stadium: Stadium de Toulouse |

| 12 November 2000 15 | Strasbourg | 0–2 | Bordeaux | Strasbourg |
| --:-- CET (UTC+1) | | | | Stadium: Stade de la Meinau |

| 19 November 2000 16 | Auxerre | 1–2 | Strasbourg | Auxerre |
| --:-- CET (UTC+1) | | | | Stadium: Stade Abbé-Deschamps |

| 25 November 2000 17 | Strasbourg | 0–3 | Lyon | Strasbourg |
| --:-- CET (UTC+1) | | | | Stadium: Stade de la Meinau |

| 29 November 2000 18 | Lille | 1–1 | Strasbourg | Lille |
| --:-- CET (UTC+1) | | | | Stadium: Stade Grimonprez-Jooris |

| 2 December 2000 19 | Monaco | 1–0 | Strasbourg | Monaco |
| --:-- CET (UTC+1) | | | | Stadium: Stade Louis II |

| 9 December 2000 20 | Strasbourg | 1–1 | Rennes | Strasbourg |
| --:-- CET (UTC+1) | | | | Stadium: Stade de la Meinau |

| 16 December 2000 21 | Sedan | 1–0 | Strasbourg | Sedan |
| --:-- CET (UTC+1) | | | | Stadium: Stade Louis Dugauguez |

| 13 January 2001 23 | Bastia | 3–1 | Strasbourg | Furiani |
| --:-- CET (UTC+1) | | | | Stadium: Stade Armand Cesari |

| 27 January 2001 24 | Strasbourg | 3–3 | Troyes | Strasbourg |
| --:-- CET (UTC+1) | | | | Stadium: Stade de la Meinau |

| 13 January 2001 25 | Saint-Étienne | 3–3 | Strasbourg | Saint-Étienne |
| --:-- CET (UTC+1) | | | | Stadium: Stade Geoffroy-Guichard |

| 7 February 2001 26 | Strasbourg | 1–0 | Lens | Strasbourg |
| --:-- CET (UTC+1) | | | | Stadium: Stade de la Meinau |

| 18 February 2001 27 | Nantes | 1–0 | Strasbourg | Nantes |
| --:-- CET (UTC+1) | | | | Stadium: Stade de la Beaujoire |

| 3 March 2001 28 | Strasbourg | 0–1 | Guingamp | Strasbourg |
| --:-- CET (UTC+1) | | | | Stadium: Stade de la Meinau |

| 17 March 2001 29 | Marseille | 0–0 | Strasbourg | Marseille |
| --:-- CET (UTC+1) | | | | Stadium: Stade Vélodrome |

| 7 April 2001 30 | Strasbourg | 1–0 | Toulouse | Strasbourg |
| --:-- CEST (UTC+2) | | | | Stadium: Stade de la Meinau |

| 11 April 2001 22 | Strasbourg | 0–1 | Metz | Strasbourg |
| --:-- CEST (UTC+2) | | | | Stadium: Stade de la Meinau |

| 14 April 2001 31 | Bordeaux | 2–1 | Strasbourg | Bordeaux |
| --:-- CEST (UTC+2) | | | | Stadium: Stade Chaban-Delmas |

| 28 April 2001 32 | Strasbourg | 1–0 | Auxerre | Strasbourg |
| --:-- CEST (UTC+2) | | | | Stadium: Stade de la Meinau |

| 12 May 2001 33 | Lyon | 5–0 | Strasbourg | Lyon |
| --:-- CEST (UTC+2) | | | | Stadium: Stade de Gerland |

| 19 May 2001 34 | Strasbourg | 1–2 | Paris Saint-Germain | Strasbourg |
| --:-- CEST (UTC+2) | | | | Stadium: Stade de la Meinau |

=== Coupe de France ===
| 21 January 2001 Round of 64 | Nancy | 1–2 | Strasbourg | Tomblaine |
| --:-- CET (UTC+1) | | | | Stadium: Stade Marcel Picot |

| 10 February 2001 Round of 32 | Clermont | 0–1 | Strasbourg | Clermont-Ferrand |
| --:-- CET (UTC+1) | | | | Stadium: Stade Gabriel Montpied |

| 9 March 2001 Round of 16 | Valence | 0–2 | Strasbourg | Valence |
| --:-- CET (UTC+1) | | | | Stadium: Stade Georges Pompidou |

| 1 April 2001 Quarter-finals | Strasbourg | 3–0 | Lyon | Strasbourg |
| --:-- CEST (UTC+2) | | | | Stadium: Stade de la Meinau |

| 20 April 2001 Semi-finals | Strasbourg | 4–1 | Nantes | Strasbourg |
| --:-- CEST (UTC+2) | Luyindula 29'; Johansen 55'; Camadini 72'; Chilavert 90' (pen.) | | Vahirua 83' | Stadium: Stade de la Meinau |

| 26 May 2001 Final | Strasbourg | 0–0 (a.e.t.) (5–4 p) | Amiens | Saint-Denis |
| --:-- CEST (UTC+2) | | | | Stadium: Stade de France; Attendance: 78,641; Referee: Alain Duhamel |
| | Penalties |
| | Bertin (penalty scored); Rémy (penalty scored); Luyindula (penalty scored); Ismaël (penalty scored); Chilavert (penalty scored) | | (penalty scored) Sampil; (penalty scored) Darbelet; (penalty scored) Chalier; (penalty missed) Abalo; (penalty scored) Strzelczak |

=== Coupe de la Ligue ===
| 7 January 2001 Round of 32 | Strasbourg | 2–2 (2–4 p) | Châteauroux | Strasbourg |
| --:-- CET (UTC+1) | | | | Stadium: Stade de la Meinau |

== Sources ==
- RSSSF - France 2000/01
- The season on racingstub.com
