= 2000–01 Coupe de France =

Football tournament season

Tournament details
- Country: France
- Teams: 6,375

Final positions
- Champions: Strasbourg
- Runners-up: Amiens

Tournament statistics
- Top goal scorer(s): Djibril Cissé; Marama Vahirua (5 goals)

The Coupe de France 2000–01 was its 84th edition. It was won by the RC Strasbourg, which defeated Amiens SC in the final.

== Round of 64 ==
Team 1	Score	Team 2
Rennes (D1)	2–1	Guingamp (D1)
Auxerre (D1)	1–0	Lille (D1)
Lens (D1)	2–2 (a.e.t.) (1–3 p)	Troyes (D1)
Lyon (D1)	3–2	Caen (D2)
Châteauroux (D2)	0–0 (a.e.t.) (10–9 p)	Toulouse (D1)
Nancy (D2)	1–2	Strasbourg (D1)
Gazélec Ajaccio (Nat.)	2–3 (a.e.t.)	Saint-Étienne (D1)
Valence (Nat.)	1–0	AS Monaco (D1)
Thouars (Nat.)	0–2 (a.e.t.)	Paris Saint-Germain (D1)
Pacy VEF (Nat.)	0–9	Nantes (D1)
Calais (CFA)	1–3	Sedan (D1
Dieppe (CFA)	1–2	Metz (D1)
ES Thaon (DH)	0–4	Marseille (D1)
Annonay (Ligue)	0–3	Bastia (D1)
Issoire (Ligue)	0–5	Bordeaux (D1)
Laval (D2)	0–1	Angers (D2)
Le Mans (D2)	1–0	Ajaccio (D2)
Clermont (Nat.)	2–2 (a.e.t.) (5–4 p)	Sochaux (D2)
Sète (CFA)	2–1	AS Cannes (D2)
Marcq-en-Bareuil (Ligue)	0–2	Wasquehal (D2)
Libourne-Saint-Seurin (CFA)	2–2 (a.e.t.) (3–4 p)	Grenoble (Nat.)
Chalon (CFA2)	1–1 (a.e.t.) (1–4 p)	Reims (Nat.)
SO Cholet (CFA2)	0–0	La Roche (Nat.)
Lambres-les-Douai (Ligue)	0–2	Amiens (Nat.)
Saint-Omer (CFA2)	1–0	Cherbourg (CFA)
Concarneau (CFA2)	1–2	Fontenay (CFA)
Amnéville (DH)	0–4	Boulogne (CFA)
Bayeux (DH)	0–2	Vannes (CFA)
Vandoeuvre (Ligue)	1–2	Levallois (CFA)
GC Lunel (CFA2)	0–2	Carcassonne (CFA2)
Montceau (DH)	0–1	Saint-Georges (CFA2)
Montmorillon (Ligue)	1–2	Sens (DH)

== Round of 32 ==
Team 1	Score	Team 2
Lyon (D1)	1–1 (a.e.t.) (4–3 p)	Saint-Étienne (D1)
Bordeaux (D1)	0–1	Nantes (D1)
Bastia (D1)	4–1	Metz (D1)
Paris Saint-Germain (D1)	0–4	Auxerre (D1)
Châteauroux (D2)	1–0	Marseille (D1)
Clermont (Nat.)	0–1	Strasbourg (D1)
Amiens (Nat.)	3–1	Rennes (D1)
Fontenay (CFA)	1–0	Sedan (D1)
Sens (DH)	1–3	Troyes (D1)
La Roche (Nat.)	1–3 (a.e.t.)	Le Mans (D2)
Angers (D2)	0–0 (a.e.t.) (8–9 p)	Reims (Nat.)
Levallois (CFA)	0–1	Wasquehal (D2)
Valence (Nat.)	3–2 (a.e.t.)	Boulogne (CFA)
Carcassonne (CFA2)	2–1	Sète (CFA)
Saint-Omer (CFA2)	0–2 (a.e.t.)	Grenoble (Nat.)
Vannes (CFA)	1–0	Saint-Georges (CFA2)

== Round of 16 ==
Team 1	Score	Team 2
Valence (Nat.)	0–2	Strasbourg (D1)
Reims (Nat.)	1–0	Bastia (D1)
Amiens (Nat.)	0–0 (a.e.t.) (4–2 p)	Le Mans (D2)
Châteauroux (D2)	0–2	Grenoble (Nat.)
Carcassonne (CFA2)	0–3	Nantes (D1)
Fontenay (CFA)	1–1 (a.e.t.) (4–5 p)	Lyon (D1)
Vannes (CFA)	1–2	Auxerre (D1)
Troyes (D1)	1–0	Wasquehal (D2)

== Quarter-finals ==
30 March 2001	Grenoble (3)	2–4	Troyes (1)	Grenoble
	David 40'; Debrosse 56' (pen.)		Boutal 25'; Goussé 47'; Đukić 80' (pen.); Niang 90'	Stadium: Stade Lesdiguières; Attendance: 14,000; Referee: Bruno Coué

31 March 2001	Nantes (1)	4–1 (a.e.t.)	Auxerre (1)	Nantes
	Fabbri 58'; Laspalles 114'; Vahirua 116', 120'		Cissé 53'	Stadium: Stade de la Beaujoire; Attendance: 25,567; Referee: Pascal Garibian

31 March 2001	Amiens (3)	1–0	Reims (3)	Amiens
	Sampil 71'			Stadium: Stade de la Licorne; Attendance: 12,000; Referee: Bertrand Layec

1 April 2001	Strasbourg (1)	3–0	Lyon (1)	Strasbourg
	Johansen 79'; Ljuboja 84'; Luyindula 89'			Stadium: Stade de la Meinau; Attendance: 13,158; Referee: Alain Sars

== Semi-finals ==
20 April 2001	Strasbourg (1)	4–1	Nantes (1)	Strasbourg
	Luyindula 29'; Johansen 55'; Camadini 72'; Chilavert 90' (pen.)		Vahirua 83'	Stadium: Stade de la Meinau; Attendance: 16,469; Referee: Claude Colombo

21 April 2001	Amiens (3)	0–0 (a.e.t.) (4–2 p)	Troyes (1)	Amiens
				Stadium: Stade de la Licorne; Attendance: 11,500; Referee: Alain Sars
	Penalties
	Sampil (penalty scored); Darbelet (penalty scored); Chalier (penalty scored); Duchemin (penalty scored)		(penalty scored) Boutal; (penalty scored) Adam; (penalty missed) Hamed; (penalty missed) Đukić

== Final ==
26 May 2001
20:45

Strasbourg	0–0 (a.e.t.)	Amiens
Penalties
Bertin (penalty scored); Rémy (penalty scored); Luyindula (penalty scored); Ismaël (penalty scored); Chilavert (penalty scored)	5–4	(penalty scored) Sampil; (penalty scored) Darbelet; (penalty scored) Chalier; (penalty missed) Abalo; (penalty scored) Strzelczak

Stade de France, Saint-Denis
Attendance: 78,641
Referee: Laurent Duhamel

== Topscorer ==
Djibril Cissé (5 goals)
Marama Vahirua (5 goals)
