= 2001–02 Grenoble Foot 38 season =

Grenoble Foot 38
2001–02 season
- French Division 2: 16th
- Coupe de France: Round of 32
- Coupe de la Ligue: First round

The 2001–02 season was the 91st season in the existence of Grenoble Foot 38 and the club's third consecutive season in the second division of French football. In addition to the domestic league, Grenoble Foot 38 competed in this season's edition of the Coupe de France and Coupe de la Ligue. The season covered the period from 1 July 2001 to 30 June 2002.

== Players ==
=== First-team squad ===
Note: Flags indicate national team as defined under FIFA eligibility rules; some limited exceptions apply. Players may hold more than one non-FIFA nationality.

No.	Pos.	Nation	Player
—	GK	(France) FRA	Cédric Mignani
—	GK	(France) FRA	Michaël Diaferia
—	GK	(France) FRA	Fabien Vidotto
—	GK	(France) FRA	Frédéric Gueguen
—	DF	(Senegal) SEN	Ibrahima Sonko
—	DF	(France) FRA	Cyrille Courtin
—	DF	(Senegal) SEN	Pape Hamadou N'Diaye
—	DF	(France) FRA	Hervé Milazzo
—	DF	(France) FRA	William Louiron
—	DF	(France) FRA	Mickaël Ravaux
—	DF	(France) FRA	Julien Benhamou
—	DF	(France) FRA	Nicolas Weber
—	MF	(Mauritius) MRI	Jacques-Désiré Périatambée

No.	Pos.	Nation	Player
—	MF	(France) FRA	Laurent Debrosse
—	MF	(Switzerland) SUI	Paulo Diogo
—	MF	(France) FRA	Joël André
—	MF	(France) FRA	Gilles Doucende
—	MF	(France) FRA	Raphaël Camacho
—	MF	(France) FRA	Laurent David
—	FW	(Togo) TOG	Mickaël Dogbé
—	FW	(Algeria) ALG	Ali Meçabih
—	FW	(France) FRA	Jacques Rémy
—	FW	(Burkina Faso) BFA	Dieudonné Minoungou
—	FW	(France) FRA	Xavier Dablemont
—	FW	(Cameroon) CMR	Bertrand Tchami
—	FW	(France) FRA	Cyrille Carrière

== Competitions ==
Win Draw Loss

=== Overall record ===
Competition	First match	Last match	Starting round	Final position	Record							
Competition	First match	Last match	Starting round	Final position	Pld	W	D	L	GF	GA	GD	Win %
Division 2	28 July 2001	3 May 2002	Matchday 1	16th	38	10	12	16	38	55	−17	26.32
Coupe de France	23 November 2001	14 December 2001	Seventh round	Round of 32	3	2	0	1	7	7	+0	66.67
Coupe de la Ligue	September 2001		First round	First round	1	0	0	1	0	1	−1	0.00
Total					42	12	12	18	45	63	−18	28.57

Source: Competitions

=== French Division 2 ===
==== League table ====
Pos	Team	Pld	W	D	L	GF	GA	GD	Pts
14	Gueugnon	38	9	17	12	42	49	−7	44
15	Wasquehal	38	11	10	17	43	55	−12	43
16	Grenoble	38	10	12	16	38	55	−17	42
17	Istres	38	8	17	13	34	43	−9	41
18	Créteil	38	9	14	15	35	46	−11	41

Source: Ligue 2

==== Results summary ====
Overall								Home						Away					
Pld	W	D	L	GF	GA	GD	Pts	W	D	L	GF	GA	GD	W	D	L	GF	GA	GD
38	10	12	16	38	55	−17	42	8	4	7	26	27	−1	2	8	9	12	28	−16

Source: Ligue 2

==== Results by round ====
Round	1	2	3	4	5	6	7	8	9	10	11	12	13	14	15	16	17	18	19	20	21	22	23	24	25	26	27	28	29	30	31	32	33	34	35	36	37	38
Ground	H	H	A	H	A	H	A	H	A	H	A	H	A	H	A	H	A	H	A	A	H	A	H	A	H	A	H	A	H	A	H	A	H	A	H	A	H	A
Result	W	D	L	W	L	W	D	L	W	D	L	L	L	D	L	L	D	W	D	L	W	D	W	L	W	L	W	D	L	D	D	D	L	D	L	W	L	L
Position	3	4	10	7	10	6	8	9	7	7	11	12	13	14	15	16	16	15	16	16	14	14	13	13	11	13	11	11	13	13	14	15	16	16	16	16	16	16

Source: Ligue 2
A = Away; H = Home; W = Win; D = Draw; L = Loss

==== Matches ====
	Grenoble	v	Ajaccio	Grenoble
--:-- CEST (UTC+2)				Stadium: Stade Lesdiguières

	Ajaccio	v	Grenoble	Ajaccio
--:-- CEST (UTC+2)				Stadium: Stade François Coty

	Grenoble	v	Amiens	Grenoble
--:-- CEST (UTC+2)				Stadium: Stade Lesdiguières

	Amiens	v	Grenoble	Amiens
--:-- CEST (UTC+2)				Stadium: Stade de la Licorne

	Grenoble	v	Beauvais	Grenoble
--:-- CEST (UTC+2)				Stadium: Stade Lesdiguières

	Beauvais	v	Grenoble	Beauvais
--:-- CEST (UTC+2)				Stadium: Stade Pierre Brisson

	Grenoble	v	Caen	Grenoble
--:-- CEST (UTC+2)				Stadium: Stade Lesdiguières

	Caen	v	Grenoble	Caen
--:-- CEST (UTC+2)				Stadium: Stade Michel d'Ornano

	Grenoble	v	Châteauroux	Grenoble
--:-- CEST (UTC+2)				Stadium: Stade Lesdiguières

	Châteauroux	v	Grenoble	Châteauroux
--:-- CEST (UTC+2)				Stadium: Stade Gaston-Petit

	Grenoble	v	Créteil	Grenoble
--:-- CEST (UTC+2)				Stadium: Stade Lesdiguières

	Créteil	v	Grenoble	Créteil
--:-- CEST (UTC+2)				Stadium: Stade Dominique Duvauchelle

	Grenoble	v	Gueugnon	Grenoble
--:-- CEST (UTC+2)				Stadium: Stade Lesdiguières

	Gueugnon	v	Grenoble	Gueugnon
--:-- CEST (UTC+2)				Stadium: Stade Jean Laville

	Grenoble	v	Istres	Grenoble
--:-- CEST (UTC+2)				Stadium: Stade Lesdiguières

	Istres	v	Grenoble	Istres
--:-- CEST (UTC+2)				Stadium: Stade Bernard Bardin

	Grenoble	v	Laval	Grenoble
--:-- CEST (UTC+2)				Stadium: Stade Lesdiguières

	Laval	v	Grenoble	Laval
--:-- CEST (UTC+2)				Stadium: Stade Francis Le Basser

	Grenoble	v	Le Havre	Grenoble
--:-- CEST (UTC+2)				Stadium: Stade Lesdiguières

	Le Havre	v	Grenoble	Le Havre
--:-- CEST (UTC+2)				Stadium: Stade Jules Deschaseaux

	Grenoble	v	Le Mans	Grenoble
--:-- CEST (UTC+2)				Stadium: Stade Lesdiguières

	Le Mans	v	Grenoble	Le Mans
--:-- CEST (UTC+2)				Stadium: Stade Léon-Bollée

	Grenoble	v	Martigues	Grenoble
--:-- CEST (UTC+2)				Stadium: Stade Lesdiguières

	Martigues	v	Grenoble	Martigues
--:-- CEST (UTC+2)				Stadium: Stade Francis Turcan

	Grenoble	v	Nancy	Grenoble
--:-- CEST (UTC+2)				Stadium: Stade Lesdiguières

	Nancy	v	Grenoble	Tomblaine
--:-- CEST (UTC+2)				Stadium: Stade Marcel Picot

	Grenoble	v	Nice	Grenoble
--:-- CEST (UTC+2)				Stadium: Stade Lesdiguières

	Nice	v	Grenoble	Nice
--:-- CEST (UTC+2)				Stadium: Stade du Ray

	Grenoble	v	Nîmes	Grenoble
--:-- CEST (UTC+2)				Stadium: Stade Lesdiguières

	Nîmes	v	Grenoble	Nîmes
--:-- CEST (UTC+2)				Stadium: Stade des Costières

	Grenoble	v	Niort	Grenoble
--:-- CEST (UTC+2)				Stadium: Stade Lesdiguières

	Niort	v	Grenoble	Niort
--:-- CEST (UTC+2)				Stadium: Stade René Gaillard

	Grenoble	v	Saint-Étienne	Grenoble
--:-- CEST (UTC+2)				Stadium: Stade Lesdiguières

	Saint-Étienne	v	Grenoble	Saint-Étienne
--:-- CEST (UTC+2)				Stadium: Stade Geoffroy-Guichard

	Grenoble	v	Strasbourg	Grenoble
--:-- CEST (UTC+2)				Stadium: Stade Lesdiguières

	Strasbourg	v	Grenoble	Strasbourg
--:-- CEST (UTC+2)				Stadium: Stade de la Meinau

	Grenoble	v	Wasquehal	Grenoble
--:-- CEST (UTC+2)				Stadium: Stade Lesdiguières

	Wasquehal	v	Grenoble	Villeneuve-d'Ascq
--:-- CEST (UTC+2)				Stadium: Stadium Lille Métropole

== Statistics ==
=== Squad statistics ===
No.	Pos	Nat	Player	Total		Division 2		Coupe de France		Coupe de la Ligue			
No.	Pos	Nat	Player	Apps	Goals	Apps	Goals	Apps	Goals	Apps	Goals		
Goalkeepers
1	GK	(France) FRA	[[]]	0	0	0	0	0	0	0	0	0	0
1	GK	(France) FRA	[[]]	0	0	0	0	0	0	0	0	0	0
Defenders
1	DF	(France) FRA	[[]]	0	0	0	0	0	0	0	0	0	0
1	DF	(France) FRA	[[]]	0	0	0	0	0	0	0	0	0	0
Midfielders
1	MF	(France) FRA	[[]]	0	0	0	0	0	0	0	0	0	0
1	MF	(France) FRA	[[]]	0	0	0	0	0	0	0	0	0	0
Forwards
1	FW	(France) FRA	[[]]	0	0	0	0	0	0	0	0	0	0
1	FW	(France) FRA	[[]]	0	0	0	0	0	0	0	0	0	0
Players who have made an appearance or had a squad number this season but have left the club
1	GK	(France) FRA	[[]]	0	0	0	0	0	0	0	0	0	0

=== Goalscorers ===
Rank	No.	Pos	Nat	Name	Division 2	Coupe de France	Coupe de la Ligue	Total	
1	1	FW	(France)	[[]]	0	0	0	0	
2	2	MF	(France)	[[]]	0	0	0	0	
2	Totals					0	0	0	0
