= 2001 Coupe de France final =

Final of the 2000–01 Coupe de France

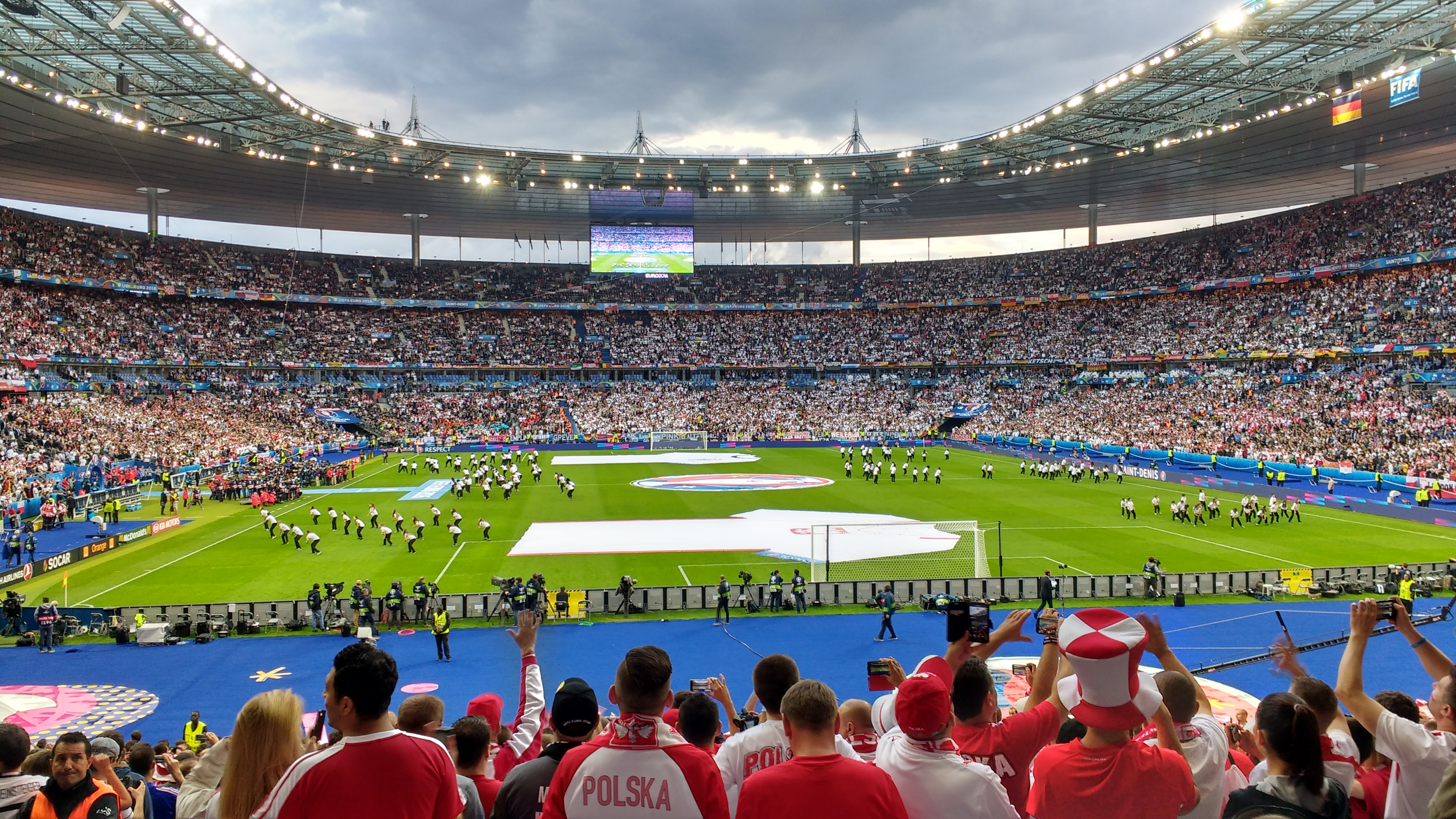
- Event: 2000–01 Coupe de France
Strasbourg	Amiens
0	0
- After extra time Strasbourg won 5–4 on penalties
- Date: 26 May 2001
- Venue: Stade de France, Saint-Denis
- Referee: Laurent Duhamel
- Attendance: 78,641

The 2001 Coupe de France final was a football match held at Stade de France, Saint-Denis on 26 May 2001, that saw RC Strasbourg defeat Amiens SC in a penalty shoot-out. After 120 minutes of play could not separate the two sides, the match went to penalties. Jean-Paul Abalo missed for Amiens, while José Luis Chilavert secured the victory for the Alsatian side.

== Road to the final ==
Strasbourg			Round	Amiens
Opponent	H/A	Result	2000–01 Coupe de France	Opponent	H/A	Result
Nancy	A	2–1	Round of 64	Lambres-les-Douai	A	2–0
Clermont	A	1–0	Round of 32	Rennes	H	3–1
Valence	A	2–0	Round of 16	Le Mans	H	0–0 (a.e.t.); 4−2 pen.
Lyon	H	3–0	Quarter-finals	Reims	H	1–0
Nantes	H	4–1	Semi-finals	Troyes	H	0–0 (a.e.t.); 4−2 pen.

== Match details ==
26 May 2001
20:45

Strasbourg	0–0 (a.e.t.)	Amiens
Penalties
Bertin (penalty scored); Rémy (penalty scored); Luyindula (penalty scored); Ismaël (penalty scored); Chilavert (penalty scored)	5–4	(penalty scored) Sampil; (penalty scored) Darbelet; (penalty scored) Chalier; (penalty missed) Abalo; (penalty scored) Strzelczak

Stade de France, Saint-Denis
Attendance: 78,641
Referee: Laurent Duhamel

GK	1	(Paraguay) José Luis Chilavert
CB	3	(France) Yannick Fischer
CB	5	(France) Teddy Bertin
CB	4	(France) Valérien Ismaël
RM	11	(Senegal) Habib Beye
CM	9	(France) Pascal Camadini	(substituted off) 104'
CM	6	(France) Pascal Johansen
LM	7	(Morocco) Gharib Amzine	(substituted off) 55'
RF	2	(Cameroon) Pierre Njanka
CF	8	(France) Péguy Luyindula
LF	10	(France) Corentin Martins (c)
Substitutes:
FW	15	(France) Jacques Rémy	(substituted in) 55'
FW	12	(Serbia and Montenegro) Danijel Ljuboja	(substituted in) 104'
Manager:
(France) Yvon Pouliquen

GK	1	(France) Julien Lachuer
RB	8	(France) Arnaud Lebrun
CB	4	(Togo) Jean-Paul Abalo
CB	5	(France) Laurent Strzelczak (c)
LB	2	(France) Ludovic Leroy
DM	7	(France) Emmanuel Duchemin
RM	10	(France) Claude-Arnaud Rivenet	(substituted off) 102'
CM	3	(Republic of the Congo) Oscar Ewolo
LM	6	(France) Emmerick Darbelet
CF	9	(France) Peter Sampil
CF	11	(France) Emmanuel Coquelet	(substituted off) 76'
Substitutes:
FW	12	(France) Xavier Chalier	(substituted in) 76'
MF	13	(Algeria) Lakhdar Adjali	(substituted in) 102'
Manager:
(France) Denis Troch

== See also ==
- 2000–01 Coupe de France
