= 2000–01 OGC Nice season =

Nice
2000–01 season
- President: Silvio Rotunno
- Head coach: Sandro Salvioni
- Stadium: Stade du Ray
- French Division 2: 15th
- Coupe de France: Seventh round
- Coupe de la Ligue: Round of 32
- Average home league attendance: 3,394
- Biggest win: Nice 3–0 Laval
- Biggest defeat: Châteauroux 7–2 Nice

The 2000–01 OGC Nice season was the club's 97th season in existence and the fourth consecutive season in the top flight of French football. In addition to the domestic league, Nice participated in this season's edition of the Coupe de France and the Coupe de la Ligue. The season covers the period from 1 July 2000 to 30 June 2001.

== Transfers ==
=== In ===
No.	Pos	Player	Transferred from	Fee	Date	Source
15			TBD		1 July 2020	

=== Out ===
No.	Pos	Player	Transferred to	Fee	Date	Source
15			TBD		1 July 2020	

== Pre-season and friendlies ==
Win Draw Loss

7 July 2000 Friendly	Nice (France)	0–1	(France) Marseille	Nice
CEST (UTC+2)			Bakayoko 78'	Stadium: Stade du Ray; Attendance: 3,602

== Competitions ==
=== Overview ===
Competition	First match	Last match	Starting round	Final position	Record							
Competition	First match	Last match	Starting round	Final position	Pld	W	D	L	GF	GA	GD	Win %
French Division 2	29 July 2000	18 May 2001	Matchday 1	15th	38	13	6	19	39	56	−17	34.21
Coupe de France	25 November 2000		Seventh round	Seventh round	1	0	0	1	0	2	−2	0.00
Europa League	7 January 2001		Round of 32	Round of 32	1	0	0	1	1	2	−1	0.00
Total					40	13	6	21	40	60	−20	32.50

Source: Competitions

=== French Division 2 ===
==== League table ====
Pos	Team	Pld	W	D	L	GF	GA	GD	Pts
13	Wasquehal	38	11	12	15	37	40	−3	45
14	Le Mans	38	9	18	11	37	45	−8	45
15	Nice	38	13	6	19	39	56	−17	45
16	Créteil	38	10	13	15	37	43	−6	43
17	Caen	38	11	10	17	38	53	−15	43

Source: Ligue 2

==== Results summary ====
Overall								Home						Away					
Pld	W	D	L	GF	GA	GD	Pts	W	D	L	GF	GA	GD	W	D	L	GF	GA	GD
38	13	6	19	39	56	−17	45	10	4	5	26	17	+9	3	2	14	13	39	−26

==== Results by round ====
Round	1	2	3	4	5	6	7	8	9	10	11	12	13	14	15	16	17	18	19	20	21	22	23	24	25	26	27	28	29	30	31	32	33	34	35	36	37	38
Ground	H	A	H	A	H	A	H	H	A	H	A	H	A	H	A	H	A	H	A	H	A	H	A	H	A	A	H	A	H	A	H	A	H	A	H	A	H	A
Result	D	W	D	L	W	L	W	W	L	L	L	L	L	W	L	W	L	D	L	L	L	W	L	W	W	L	L	L	W	D	L	W	D	D	W	L	W	L
Position	13	6	8	10	9	11	8	6	7	10	11	13	16	13	15	12	12	13	15	15	16	14	15	14	13	13	15	17	16	16	17	14	13	13	12	14	12	15

A = Away; H = Home; W = Win; D = Draw; L = Loss

==== Matches ====
29 July 2000 1	Nice	0–0	Le Havre	Nice
CEST (UTC+2)				Stadium: Stade du Ray

5 August 2000 2	Gueugnon	1–2	Nice	Gueugnon
CEST (UTC+2)

12 August 2000 3	Nice	1–1	Lorient	Nice
CEST (UTC+2)				Stadium: Stade du Ray

19 August 2000 4	Wasquehal	2–1	Nice	Wasquehal
CEST (UTC+2)

26 August 2000 5	Nice	2–1	Nancy	Nice
CEST (UTC+2)				Stadium: Stade du Ray

29 August 2000 6	Laval	2–0	Nice	Laval
CEST (UTC+2)

1 September 2000 7	Nice	2–0	Créteil	Nice
CEST (UTC+2)				Stadium: Stade du Ray

6 September 2000 8	Nice	1–0	Ajaccio	Nice
CEST (UTC+2)				Stadium: Stade du Ray

9 September 2000 9	Beauvais	2–0	Nice	Beauvais
CEST (UTC+2)

16 September 2000 10	Nice	1–2	Nîmes	Nice
CEST (UTC+2)				Stadium: Stade du Ray

23 September 2000 11	Caen	1–0	Nice	Caen
CEST (UTC+2)

30 September 2000 12	Nice	0–1	Niort	Nice
CEST (UTC+2)				Stadium: Stade du Ray

7 October 2000 13	Châteauroux	7–2	Nice	Châteauroux
CEST (UTC+2)

11 October 2000 14	Nice	2–1	Martigues	Nice
CEST (UTC+2)				Stadium: Stade du Ray

14 October 2000 15	Le Mans	1–0	Nice	Le Mans
CEST (UTC+2)

21 October 2000 16	Nice	2–0	Angers	Nice
CEST (UTC+2)				Stadium: Stade du Ray

28 October 2000 17	Cannes	2–1	Nice	Cannes
CEST (UTC+2)

4 November 2000 18	Nice	2–2	Sochaux	Nice
CEST (UTC+2)				Stadium: Stade du Ray

11 November 2000 19	Montpellier	3–0	Nice	Montpellier
CEST (UTC+2)

18 November 2000 20	Nice	1–2	Gueugnon	Nice
CEST (UTC+2)				Stadium: Stade du Ray

29 November 2000 21	Lorient	3–0	Nice	Lorient
CEST (UTC+2)

2 December 2000 22	Nice	1–0	Wasquehal	Nice
CEST (UTC+2)				Stadium: Stade du Ray

9 December 2000 23	Nancy	3–1	Nice	Tomblaine
CEST (UTC+2)

21 December 2000 24	Nice	3–0	Laval	Nice
CEST (UTC+2)				Stadium: Stade du Ray

13 January 2001 25	Créteil	0–1	Nice	Créteil
CEST (UTC+2)

27 January 2001 26	Ajaccio	2–1	Nice	Ajaccio
CEST (UTC+2)

3 February 2001 27	Nice	0–1	Beauvais	Nice
CEST (UTC+2)				Stadium: Stade du Ray

7 February 2001 28	Nîmes	2–0	Nice	Nîmes
CEST (UTC+2)

16 February 2001 29	Nice	2–0	Caen	Nice
CEST (UTC+2)				Stadium: Stade du Ray

3 March 2001 30	Niort	2–2	Nice	Niort
CEST (UTC+2)

17 March 2001 31	Nice	1–4	Châteauroux	Nice
CEST (UTC+2)				Stadium: Stade du Ray

23 March 2001 32	Martigues	0–1	Nice	Martigues
CEST (UTC+2)

27 March 2001 33	Nice	1–1	Le Mans	Nice
CEST (UTC+2)				Stadium: Stade du Ray

7 April 2001 34	Angers	0–0	Nice	Angers
CEST (UTC+2)

14 April 2001 35	Nice	2–0	Cannes	Nice
CEST (UTC+2)				Stadium: Stade du Ray

28 April 2001 36	Sochaux	5–1	Nice	Montbéliard
CEST (UTC+2)

11 May 2001 37	Nice	2–1	Montpellier	Nice
CEST (UTC+2)				Stadium: Stade du Ray

18 May 2001 38	Le Havre	1–0	Nice	Le Havre
CEST (UTC+2)

=== Coupe de France ===
25 November 2000 Seventh round	Nice	0–2	Gazélec Ajaccio	Nice
CET (UTC+1)				Stadium: Stade du Ray

=== Coupe de la Ligue ===
7 January 2001 Round of 32	Bastia	2–1	Nice	Furiani
CET (UTC+1)
