= 2000–01 En Avant de Guingamp season =

En Avant de Guingamp
2000–01 season
- President: Alain Aubert
- Head coach: Guy Lacombe
- Stadium: Stade de Roudourou
- French Division 1: 10th
- Coupe de France: Round of 64
- Coupe de la Ligue: Round of 32
- Average home league attendance: 13,056
- Biggest win: Bordeaux 0–2 Guingamp; Paris Saint-Germain 1–3 Guingamp
- Biggest defeat: Guingamp 1–6 Rennes

The 2000–01 season was the 89th season in the history of En Avant de Guingamp and the club's first season back in the top flight of French football since 1998. In addition to the domestic league, Guingamp participated in this season's editions of the Coupe de France and the Coupe de la Ligue.

== Pre-season and friendlies ==
Win Draw Loss

9 March 2001 Friendly	Lens (France)	3–2	(France) Guingamp	Saint-Quentin
20:00

== Competitions ==
=== Overall record ===
Competition	First match	Last match	Starting round	Final position	Record							
Competition	First match	Last match	Starting round	Final position	Pld	W	D	L	GF	GA	GD	Win %
French Division 1	29 July 2000	19 May 2001	Matchday 1	10th	34	11	11	12	40	48	−8	32.35
Coupe de France	19 January 2001		Round of 64	Round of 64	1	0	0	1	1	2	−1	0.00
Coupe de la Ligue	6 January 2001		Round of 32	Round of 32	1	0	0	1	1	3	−2	0.00
Total					36	11	11	14	42	53	−11	30.56

Source: Competitions

=== French Division 1 ===
==== League table ====
Pos	Team	Pld	W	D	L	GF	GA	GD	Pts	Qualification or relegation
8	Bastia	34	13	6	15	45	41	+4	45	Qualification to Intertoto Cup second round
9	Paris Saint-Germain	34	12	8	14	44	45	−1	44	Qualification to Intertoto Cup second round
10	Guingamp	34	11	11	12	40	48	−8	44	
11	Monaco	34	12	7	15	53	50	+3	43	
12	Metz	34	11	9	14	35	44	−9	42	

Source: Ligue 1
Rules for classification: 1) points; 2) goal difference; 3) number of goals scored.

==== Results summary ====
Overall								Home						Away					
Pld	W	D	L	GF	GA	GD	Pts	W	D	L	GF	GA	GD	W	D	L	GF	GA	GD
34	11	11	12	40	48	−8	44	5	5	7	18	27	−9	6	6	5	22	21	+1

Source: French Division 1

==== Results by round ====
Round	1	2	3	4	5	6	7	8	9	10	11	12	13	14	15	16	17	18	19	20	21	22	23	24	25	26	27	28	29	30	31	32	33	34
Ground	H	A	H	A	A	H	A	H	A	H	A	H	A	H	A	H	A	H	A	H	H	A	H	A	H	A	H	A	H	A	H	A	H	A
Result	D	L	L	L	L	W	W	W	W	D	D	W	W	L	D	W	W	L	L	D	W	D	D	D	L	W	L	W	L	D	L	L	D	D
Position	6	12	17	17	18	16	14	12	9	8	11	7	5	6	6	5	3	4	6	6	6	6	8	8	8	8	8	8	8	8	8	10	9	10

Source: French Division 1
A = Away; H = Home; W = Win; D = Draw; L = Loss

==== Matches ====
29 July 2000 1	Guingamp	2–2	Saint-Étienne	Guingamp

5 August 2000 2	Lens	3–2	Guingamp	Lens

12 August 2000 3	Guingamp	0–1	Nantes	Guingamp

20 August 2000 4	Monaco	1–0	Guingamp	Monaco
				Stadium: Stade Louis II

26 August 2000 5	Marseille	3–1	Guingamp	Marseille

6 September 2000 6	Guingamp	2–1	Toulouse	Guingamp

9 September 2000 7	Bordeaux	0–2	Guingamp	Bordeaux

16 September 2000 8	Guingamp	1–0	Auxerre	Guingamp

23 September 2000 9	Lyon	0–1	Guingamp	Lyon

30 September 2000 10	Guingamp	1–1	Paris Saint-Germain	Guingamp

14 October 2000 11	Lille	1–1	Guingamp	Lille

21 October 2000 12	Guingamp	2–1	Strasbourg	Guingamp

29 October 2000 13	Rennes	1–2	Guingamp	Rennes

4 November 2000 14	Guingamp	0–3	Sedan	Guingamp

11 November 2000 15	Metz	1–1	Guingamp	Metz

18 November 2000 16	Guingamp	1–0	Bastia	Guingamp

25 November 2000 17	Troyes	0–1	Guingamp	Troyes

28 November 2000 18	Guingamp	0–1	Lens	Guingamp

2 December 2000 19	Nantes	2–1	Guingamp	Nantes

9 December 2000 20	Guingamp	2–2	Monaco	Guingamp

16 December 2000 21	Guingamp	1–0	Marseille	Guingamp

21 December 2000 22	Toulouse	1–1	Guingamp	Toulouse

13 January 2001 23	Guingamp	1–1	Bordeaux	Guingamp

27 January 2001 24	Auxerre	1–1	Guingamp	Auxerre

3 February 2001 25	Guingamp	2–3	Lyon	Guingamp

7 February 2001 26	Paris Saint-Germain	1–3	Guingamp	Paris

17 February 2001 27	Guingamp	0–1	Lille	Guingamp

3 March 2001 28	Strasbourg	0–1	Guingamp	Strasbourg

17 March 2001 29	Guingamp	1–6	Rennes	Guingamp

7 April 2001 30	Sedan	2–2	Guingamp	Sedan

14 April 2001 31	Guingamp	1–3	Metz	Guingamp

28 April 2001 32	Bastia	2–0	Guingamp	Furiani

12 May 2001 33	Guingamp	1–1	Troyes	Guingamp

19 May 2001 34	Saint-Étienne	2–2	Guingamp	Saint-Étienne

=== Coupe de France ===
19 January 2001 Round of 64	Rennes	2–1	Guingamp	Rennes
20:00				Stadium: Stade de la Route de Lorient; Attendance: 14,793; Referee: Bruno Derrien

=== Coupe de la Ligue ===
6 January 2001 Round of 32	Guingamp	1–3	Amiens	Guingamp
18:00				Stadium: Stade Municipal de Roudourou; Attendance: 3,908; Referee: Claude Medam
