= Frédéric Johansen =

French footballer (1972–1992)

Personal information
- Date of birth: 13 October 1972
- Place of birth: Colmar, France
- Date of death: 20 December 1992 (aged 20)
- Place of death: Hirtzfelden, France
- Height: 1.65 m (5 ft 5 in)
- Position: Midfielder

Youth career
- Colmar
- 1988–1990: Mulhouse

Senior career*
Years	Team	Apps	(Gls)
1990–1992	Mulhouse	62	(5)
Total		62	(5)

International career
1992	France U21	8	(0)
- * Club domestic league appearances and goals

Frédéric Johansen (13 October 1972 – 20 December 1992) was a French footballer. He was named player of the year for the Division 2 1991–92 season and represented France at under-21 level on eight occasions in 1992.

== Personal life and death ==
Frédéric was the brother of fellow professional footballer Pascal Johansen.

He was killed in a car accident in December 1992. His club, Mulhouse, named a stand after him in memory. The stand was closed in 2021, due to wood rot making it dangerous.
