= Cédric Kanté =

Malian footballer (born 1979)

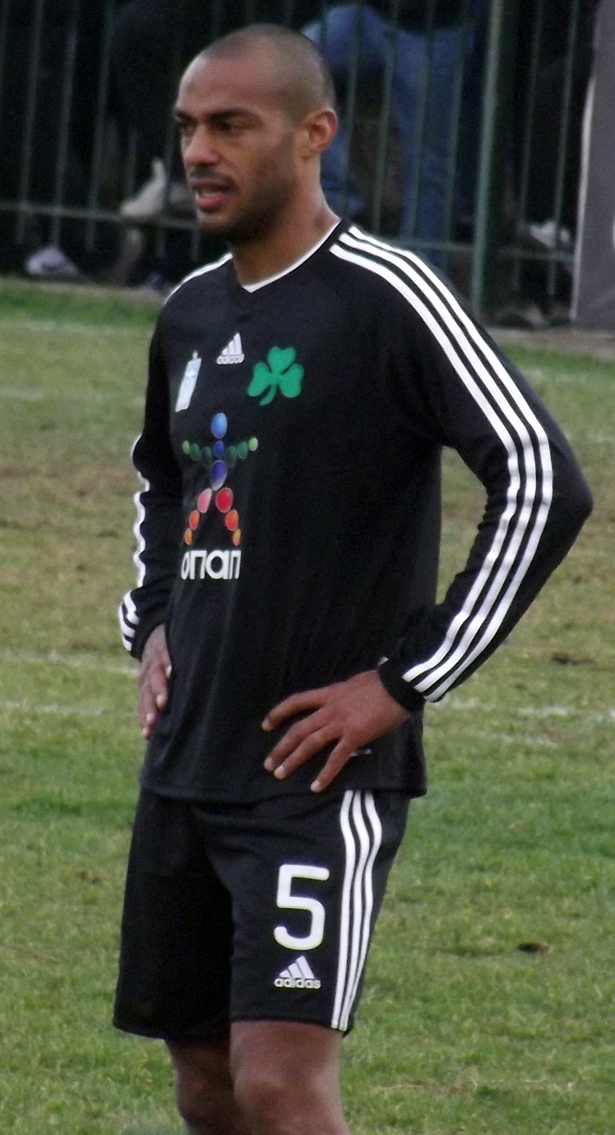
- Kanté with Panathinaikos

Personal information
- Date of birth: 6 July 1979 (age 47)
- Place of birth: Strasbourg, France
- Height: 1.82 m (6 ft 0 in)
- Positions: Centre-back; left-back

Youth career
- 1996–1999: Strasbourg

Senior career*
| Years | Team | Apps | (Gls) |
| 1999–2006 | Strasbourg | 96 | (3) |
| 2001–2002 | → Istres (loan) | 16 | (0) |
| 2002–2003 | → Valence (loan) | 32 | (0) |
| 2006–2009 | Nice | 97 | (2) |
| 2009–2012 | Panathinaikos | 88 | (2) |
| 2012–2014 | Sochaux | 49 | (1) |
| 2014–2015 | Ajaccio | 27 | (0) |
| Total | | 405 | (8) |

International career
| 2001–2012 | Mali | 45 | (1) |
- * Club domestic league appearances and goals

Cédric Kanté (born 6 July 1979) is a former professional footballer who played as a defender. Born in France, he played for the Mali national team internationally winning 41 caps and scoring once.

== Club career ==
=== Early career ===
Kanté progressed through the youth ranks at local club RC Strasbourg before starting his professional career there. He signed his first professional contract with them in 1999, at the age of 19. He spent two seasons with them, in his first stint, making 7 appearances and picking up a Coupe de France winners medal in 2001. He moved on to find first-team football playing for FC Istres, in Ligue 2. In one season at Istres, Kanté made 16 appearances. ASOA Valence saw the talent in the 21-year-old and signed him. He spent one season there and was the focal point of the team, anchoring the center of their defense. He left the club due to its financial insecurity, having made 32 appearances.

=== Strasbourg and Nice ===
He then returned to boyhood club Strasbourg, signing a three-year deal. He quickly made it into the first team and was a main part of their progression within Ligue 2. In Kanté's three seasons for the club, he scored 3 league goals in 91 appearances. At the end of his contract, he signed with Ligue 1 side Nice. His first season at the club was disappointing, with them barely escaping relegation. However his and the club had better fortunes helping them achieve an 8th-place finish in his second season. His last season was more of the same, as he helped Nice finish respectably in 9th place during the 2008–09 campaign. After three successful seasons, Kanté left the club for Super League Greece club Panathinaikos. In all, he made 97 Ligue 1 appearances for the side and added 2 goals.

=== Panathinaikos ===
Kanté signed a three-year deal with Panathinaikos in June 2009. In his first season at Panathinaikos, he helped the "Prasinoi", the Greens, to their first Greek Championship and Greek Cup in six years. In the Greek Cup Final, Kanté played a vital role in the center of the defense for Panathinaikos as they defeated Aris 1–0 with a goal from Argentinian winger Sebastián Leto.

In his first season at Panathinaikos, Kanté appeared in 21 league games and added 2 assists to his name.

=== Sochaux ===
In July 2012, Kanté returned to France, signing a two-year contract with Ligue 1 team FC Sochaux-Montbéliard.

=== Ajaccio ===
After suffering relegation to Ligue 2 with Sochaux in the 2013–14 season, Kanté left the club and signed a one-year contract with another relegated side, AC Ajaccio.

== International career ==
Born in France, Kanté was eligible to play for the Mali national team through his ancestry. He opted to play for the country of his parents' birth and represented the Eagles 25 times as well as at the 2008 Africa Cup of Nations in Ghana.

== Career statistics ==
=== International ===
Appearances and goals by national team and year
| National team | Year | Apps | Goals |
|---|---|---|---|
| Mali | 2001 | 1 | 0 |
| Mali | 2002 | 2 | 0 |
| Mali | 2003 | 6 | 0 |
| Mali | 2004 | 2 | 0 |
| Mali | 2005 | 5 | 0 |
| Mali | 2006 | 1 | 0 |
| Mali | 2007 | 4 | 0 |
| Mali | 2008 | 10 | 0 |
| Mali | 2009 | 1 | 0 |
| Mali | 2010 | 1 | 0 |
| Mali | 2011 | 6 | 1 |
| Mali | 2012 | 6 | 0 |
| Total | | 45 | 1 |

Scores and results list Mali's goal tally first, score column indicates score after each Kanté goal.

List of international goals scored by Cédric Kanté
| No. | Date | Venue | Opponent | Score | Result | Competition |
|---|---|---|---|---|---|---|
| 1 | 8 October 2011 | Samuel Kanyon Doe Sports Complex, Paynesville, Liberia | Liberia | 2–1 | 2–2 | 2012 Africa Cup of Nations qualification |

== Honours ==
Strasbourg

- Coupe de France: 2000–01
- Coupe de la Ligue: 2004–05

Panathinaikos

- Super League Greece: 2009–10
- Greek Cup: 2009–10

Mali

- Africa Cup of Nations bronze: 2012
