= Ludovic Leroy =

French footballer (born 1975)

Personal information
- Date of birth: September 20, 1975 (age 51)
- Place of birth: Le Quesnoy, France
- Height: 1.75 m (5 ft 9 in)
- Position: Defender

Team information
- Current team: SO Romorantin

Senior career*
Years	Team	Apps	(Gls)
1993–1996	Valenciennes	38	(2)
1996–2000	FC Martigues	99	(2)
2000–2002	Amiens	38	(2)
2002–2003	Gap FC		
2003–2005	Stade Reims	53	(1)
2005–2008	ES Fréjus		
2008–	SO Romorantin		
- * Club domestic league appearances and goals as of 18:38, 30 November 2009 (UTC)

Ludovic Leroy (born September 20, 1975) is a French former professional footballer who played in Ligue 2 for Valenciennes FC, FC Martigues, Amiens SC and Stade Reims. He also played lower-division football for Gap FC, ES Fréjus and SO Romorantin. He was a member of the then third-tier Amiens team that held Ligue 1 opponents Strasbourg to a goalless draw in the 2001 Coupe de France final, only to lose on penalties.
