= Yvon Pouliquen =

French footballer (born 1962)

Personal information
- Date of birth: 17 October 1962 (age 64)
- Place of birth: Morlaix, France
- Height: 1.72 m (5 ft 8 in)
- Position: Defensive midfielder

Youth career
- 1977–1982: Brest

Senior career*
Years	Team	Apps	(Gls)
1982–1987	Brest	146	(4)
1987–1989	Laval	76	(2)
1989–1991	Saint-Étienne	75	(1)
1991–1996	Strasbourg	158	(3)
Total		455	(10)

International career
1988	Brittany indoor	1	

Managerial career
- 2000–2001: Strasbourg
- 2002–2004: Lorient
- 2004–2005: Guingamp
- 2006–2007: Grenoble
- 2007–2010: Metz
- 2010–2011: Grenoble
- * Club domestic league appearances and goals

Yvon Pouliquen (born 17 October 1962) is a French football manager and former player. He played as a defensive midfielder for 14 seasons (all but one in Ligue 1) and made 455 appearances in the French league. He then spent several years as a manager, and won back-to-back Coupes de France, in 2001 with Strasbourg and in 2002 with Lorient, as well as a taking Metz to the quarter finals in 2008.

== Playing career ==
Born in Morlaix, Finistère, France, Pouliquen started his playing career aged 15 at Brest. He made his first team debut aged 19, as a half-time substitute against Tours in Ligue 1, and scored within ten minutes of entering the field of play. He spent a further five seasons with Brest, two with Laval, and another two with Saint-Étienne before joining Strasbourg, then in Ligue 2. He helped them to promotion to Ligue 1 via the playoffs in his first season at the club, scored the goal against local rivals Metz which put the club into the 1995 Coupe de France Final, and in his final year as a player helped them qualify via the Intertoto Cup for the UEFA Cup and reach the last 16. He also captained the club.

== Managerial career ==
At the end of his first team playing career, Pouliquen joined the coaching staff under manager Jacky Duguépéroux at Strasbourg, though he continued to play occasionally for the reserve team. In December 1997 he took over as reserve team coach, a post he held until his appointment as first team manager in November 2000. His tenure lasted only until the end of the 2000–01 season, in which Strasbourg won the Coupe de France but were relegated to Ligue 2.

Pouliquen took over as manager of Lorient in January 2002, leading them to their first final of the Coupe de la Ligue as well as their first major trophy in the 2002 Coupe de France. When he joined, the club were in the relegation positions, and he was unable at any stage to lift them out of the bottom three places, so for the second consecutive season he combined the cup win with relegation from the top flight. The following season Lorient made their first ever appearance in European competition, entering at the first round stage of the 2002–03 UEFA Cup, only to lose on the away goals rule to Denizlispor. At the end of the 2002–03 season Lorient narrowly failed to win promotion back to Ligue 1, and Pouliquen was replaced by Christian Gourcuff.

In June 2004 Pouliquen took over as manager of Guingamp, newly relegated to Ligue 2. Though the club had expected immediate promotion, and were disappointed with seventh place in the 2004–05 season, an excellent home record gave the manager a period of grace, but a poor start to the 2005–06 season provoked his dismissal in September 2005.

He then had a spell as manager of Grenoble Foot 38 in the 2006–07 season before joining FC Metz in December 2007 with the club bottom of Ligue 1. He was replaced by Joël Müller at the end of the 2009–10 season. In September 2010, he returned to Grenoble. Against a background of financial difficulty and a transfer embargo, Pouliquen was unable to prevent relegation to the third tier. He left at the end of the season, and Grenoble were administratively relegated a further two divisions because of its insolvency.

Pouliquen went on to become a players' agent.
