= Valérien Ismaël =

French football manager (born 1975)

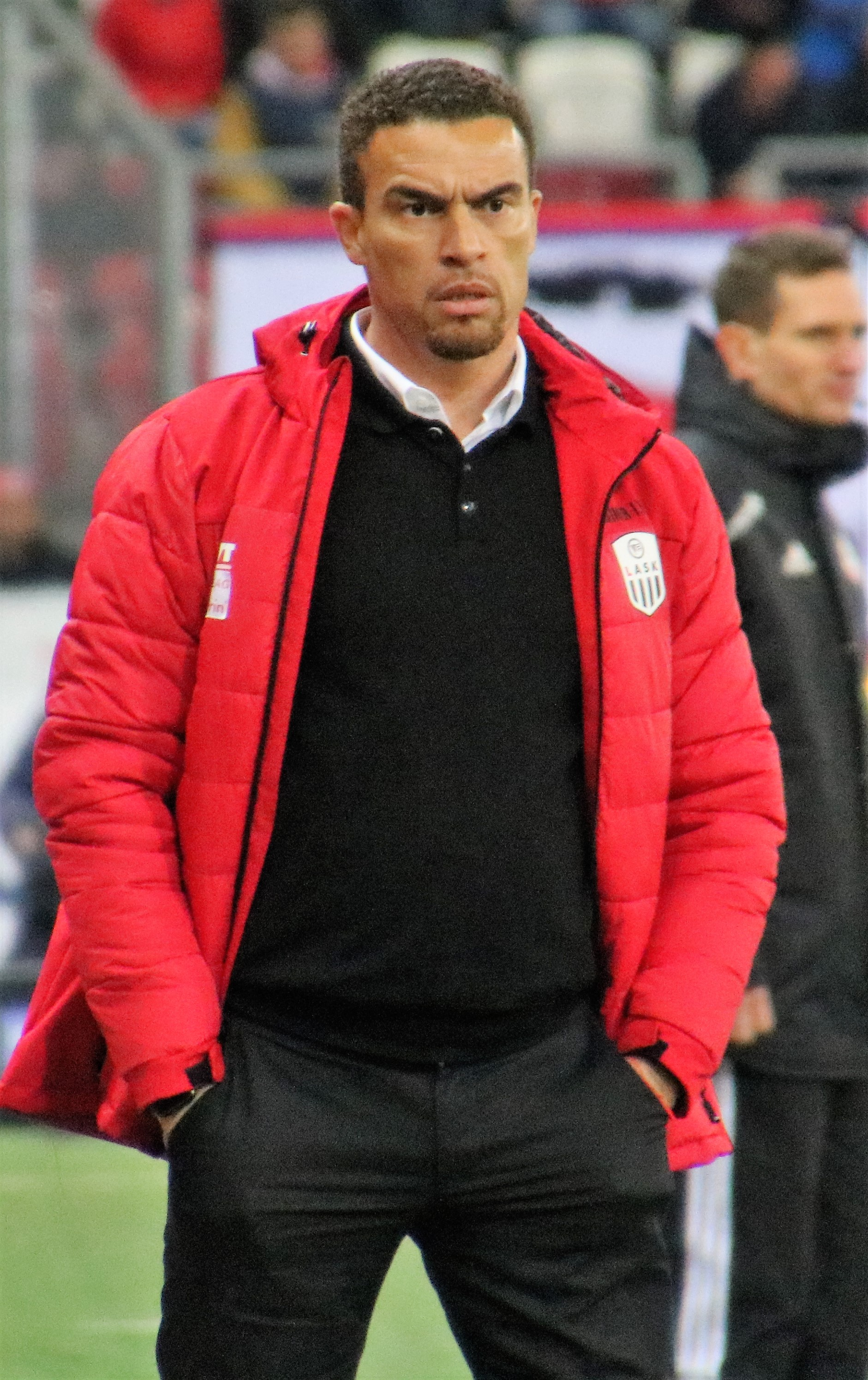
- Ismaël coaching LASK in 2019

Personal information
- Full name: Valérien Alexandre Ismaël
- Date of birth: 28 September 1975 (age 51)
- Place of birth: Strasbourg, Bas-Rhin, France
- Height: 1.91 m (6 ft 3 in)
- Position: Centre-back

Team information
- Current team: Le Havre (manager)

Youth career
- 1982–1984: AS Holtzheim
- 1984–1992: Strasbourg

Senior career*
Years	Team	Apps	(Gls)
1993–1998	Strasbourg	87	(1)
1998	Crystal Palace	13	(0)
1998–2002	Lens	83	(5)
2001	→ Strasbourg (loan)	9	(0)
2002–2004	Strasbourg	26	(2)
2003–2004	→ Werder Bremen (loan)	32	(4)
2004–2005	Werder Bremen	32	(4)
2005–2007	Bayern Munich	31	(0)
2006–2007	Bayern Munich II	7	(2)
2007–2009	Hannover 96	18	(0)
Total		338	(18)

International career
1993–1994	France U18	8	(2)
1996–1997	France U21	12	(2)

Managerial career
- 2011–2013: Hannover 96 II
- 2013–2014: VfL Wolfsburg II
- 2014: 1. FC Nürnberg
- 2015–2016: VfL Wolfsburg II
- 2016–2017: VfL Wolfsburg
- 2018: Apollon Smyrnis
- 2019–2020: LASK
- 2020–2021: Barnsley
- 2021–2022: West Bromwich Albion
- 2022: Beşiktaş
- 2023–2024: Watford
- 2025–2026: Blackburn Rovers
- 2026–: Le Havre
- * Club domestic league appearances and goals

Valérien Alexandre Ismaël (born 28 September 1975) is a French professional football manager and former player who is currently the head coach of Ligue 1 club Le Havre.

A centre-back, Ismaël played for Strasbourg, Crystal Palace, Lens, Werder Bremen, Bayern Munich and Hannover 96. As a player, he won the Coupe de France, the Coupe de la Ligue twice, the Bundesliga twice, as well as the DFB-Pokal on two occasions. Following his retirement, he moved into management, first as a reserve coach for a number of clubs before moving into senior management with spells at 1. FC Nürnberg, VfL Wolfsburg and with Austrian Bundesliga club LASK, before spells with English Championship clubs Barnsley, West Bromwich Albion and Watford. He was appointed head coach of Blackburn Rovers in February 2025 and left the club by mutual consent nearly a year later on 2 February 2026.

== Early years ==
Ismaël was born to a Guadeloupean father and an Alsatian mother, growing up in Strasbourg on the border with Germany. Ismaël's grandfather is German.

== Playing career ==
=== Strasbourg ===
Ismaël made his debut for Strasbourg against Cannes on 15 January 1994. He went on to make 77 league appearances in his first spell with the club. Additionally, he appeared in five UEFA Cup matches, scoring once.

=== Crystal Palace ===
Ismaël was signed by Crystal Palace for £2.75 million from Strasbourg in January 1998, making him the most expensive player in the club's history. However, he only played 13 games for the London club, before moving back to his native France to sign for Lens in October 1998.

=== Lens ===
Ismaël's time at Lens saw him regain his form after his brief spell in England. He played 83 times, scoring five goals. He also had a short loan spell at his former club Strasbourg during the 2000–01 Division 1 season. The club were relegated that season, but Ismaël played in the 2001 Coupe de France Final, in which Strasbourg defeated Amiens on penalties. He returned to Lens for the 2001–02 Division 1 season where he played 33 times and scored four goals. He was sold back to Strasbourg for the following season following their promotion back to the top tier.

=== Back to Strasbourg ===
On moving back to his former club for a third spell, Ismaël was appointed captain and led the club to 13th position. In his last spell at Strasbourg, he made 26 appearances and scored twice. He appeared for his home club a total of 167 times in all competitions and scored seven goals.

=== Werder Bremen ===
Ismaël was loaned to Werder Bremen in 2003 where he appeared 32 times, scoring four goals. Bremen went on to win the German double in his first season at the club. He was sold to Werder prior to the following season, where once again he appeared 32 times, scoring four goals. However, Werder could only finish third. He made seven appearances in the UEFA Champions League as well, scoring twice.

=== Bayern Munich ===
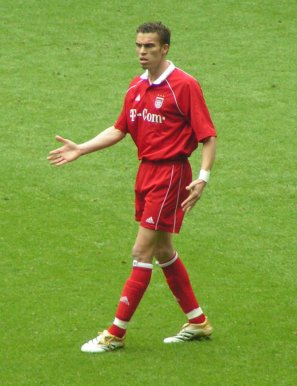
Ismaël with Bayern Munich

Ismaël arrived at Bayern Munich in July 2005. He received a red card on his debut for the club, but finished the season winning the German league and cup double for the second time in his career. However, he only featured once in the 2006–07 campaign for the club due to his long term injury and was eventually released to join Hannover 96 in January 2008. He made 31 league appearances for Bayern without scoring and eight Champions league appearances, scoring once against A.C. Milan in a 4–1 loss.

=== Hannover 96 ===
Ismaël was brought to the club in order to strengthen the struggling defence and to provide leadership for his new teammates. His first game for Hannover was against his previous club, Bayern, playing well for 45 minutes and helping his team maintain a 0–0. After he was substituted with a minor injury, Hannover conceded three goals in the second half. After overcoming the injury, he became a key player for the team. Due to further injuries he retired on 5 October 2009. In total he made 18 appearances for Hannover.

== International career ==
Ismaël made appearances for the French under-18 and under-21 teams. When he was not called up to the senior team, it was reported that he wanted to represent Germany. However, he was rejected by the German Football Association (DFB) because there was not enough connection to Germany. In an interview with the German sports magazine Kicker, Ismael said: "I am French, and I still hope for my chance to play for France. I'm feeling fine in Germany, but I do not want to volunteer. Only if Klinsmann wants me, then we would have to talk about it." If former Germany coach Jürgen Klinsmann was interested in him, Ismaël wanted to check his ancestry.

Gernot Rohr said of the exclusion of Ismaël from the senior team: "Although Valérien was a U-21 international, he was never an option for the senior team. Of course, Valérien is one of the better centre-backs, but he was never so striking that he could compete with the first-team regulars." Ismaël saw it differently: "There used to be big names, okay. But today, I am no worse than those who are there." After Ismaël offered his services in October 2005 again to the Germany national team, he again received a rejection. Later in March 2006, the German Football Association announced that Ismaël was not eligible to play for Germany because he had played a U-21 European Championship qualifier for France in August 1996. According to FIFA rules, he would have needed German citizenship back in 1996 to have made the switch.

It was reported that Togo also wanted to call up Ismaël to their squad for the 2006 FIFA World Cup, given his former wife is partially Togolese descent, but he denied the approach and interest in the offer.

== Managerial career ==
=== Hannover 96 ===
On 10 October 2009, Ismaël became the assistant general manager of Hannover 96. From 24 June 2010, he was also board member of the club. On 28 November 2011, he took over the job of manager of the second team, Hannover 96 II. In the 2011–12 season, Hannover II finished in sixth place with a record of 14 wins, eight draws and 12 losses. During the 2012–13 season, Hannover II finished in fourth place with a record of 16 wins, six draws, and eight losses. Ismaël left on 30 June 2013.

=== VfL Wolfsburg II ===
Ismaël was manager of VfL Wolfsburg II between 1 July 2013 and 5 June 2014. Wolfsburg II won the Regionalliga Nord in the 2013–14 season and lost to Sonnenhof Großaspach in the promotion play-off.

=== 1. FC Nürnberg ===
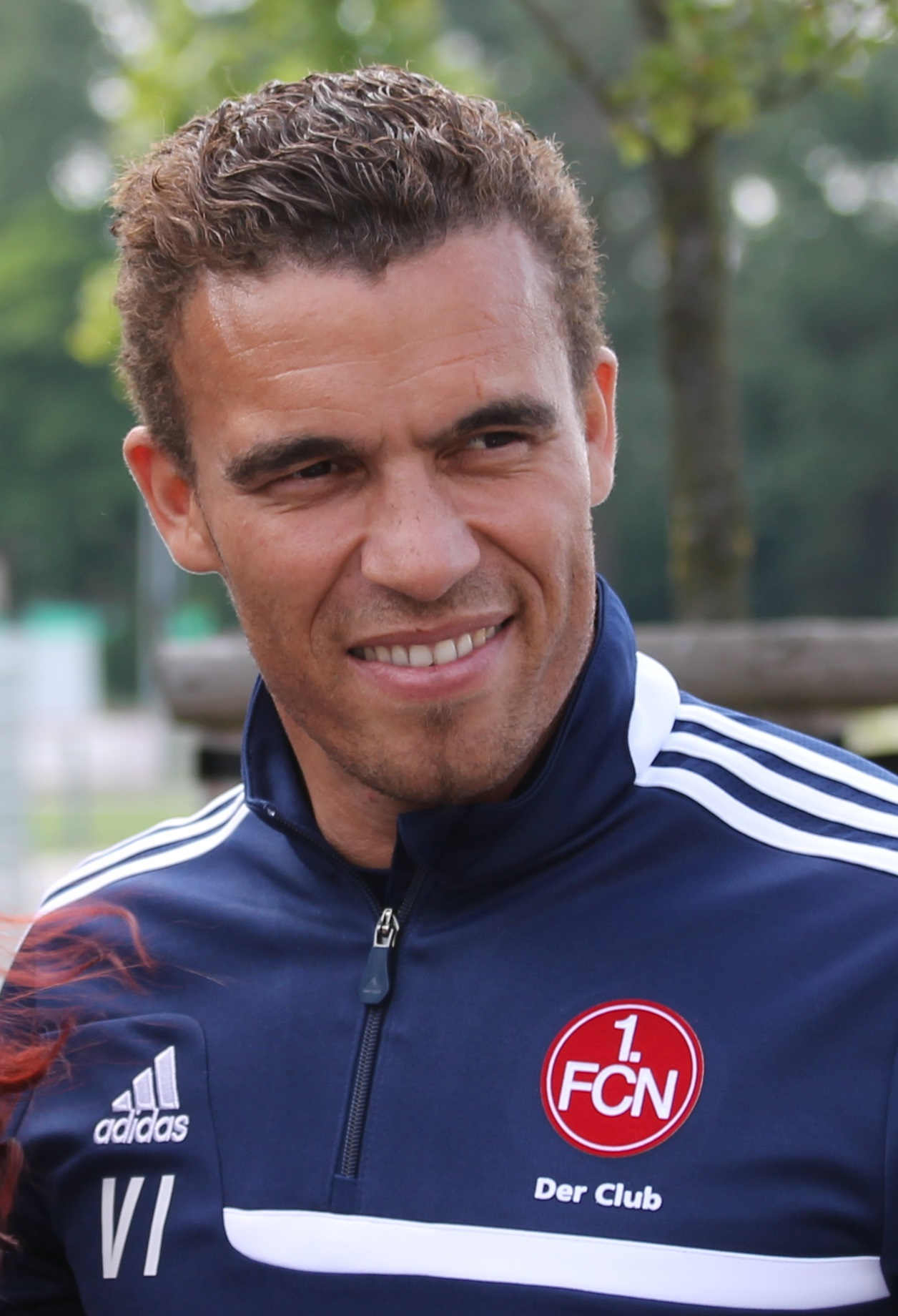
Ismaël as 1. FC Nürnberg manager in 2014

Ismaël became the new head coach of 1. FC Nürnberg on 5 June 2014 and won his first match in charge against Erzgebirge Aue 1–0 on 3 August 2014. He went on to lose eight of his next 13 matches and was dismissed on 10 November 2014; three days after a 2–1 loss to SV Sandhausen. He finished with a record of four wins, two draws, and eight losses.

=== Return to VfL Wolfsburg II ===
Ismaël returned to VfL Wolfsburg II on 1 June 2015. Repeating the success of his first tenure with the team, Wolfsburg II won the 2015–16 Regionalliga Nord. Once again though, Wolfsburg II lost in the promotion play-off, this time to Jahn Regensburg.

=== VfL Wolfsburg ===
First-team head coach Dieter Hecking was dismissed on 17 October 2016 and was replaced by Ismaël on an interim basis. In his first four games in charge, Wolfsburg managed to win twice. Ismaël was promoted from interim coach to permanent head coach on 7 November 2016. Ismaël was dismissed on 26 February 2017.

=== Apollon Smyrnis ===
On 29 May 2018, it was announced that Ismaël had signed a two-year deal with Super League Greece club Apollon Smyrnis. However, after only managing them for one league game against Larissa on 25 August 2018, in which Apollon lost 0–1 at home, he was dismissed from his managerial post six days later due to disagreements with the club's president.

=== LASK ===
Ismaël succeeded Oliver Glasner as the new head coach and sporting director of Austrian team LASK for the 2019–20 Austrian Football Bundesliga. In the first few months of his tenure, he led the team to the best start in the club's history (17 points from 8 games). He also led LASK to a first ever appearance in the UEFA Champions League play-offs. After defeating favourites Basel, the team fell short against Club Brugge. In LASK's first ever appearance in the UEFA Europa League, the team won the group with Sporting Lisbon, PSV Eindhoven and Rosenborg. After defeating AZ in the round of 32, LASK lost against Manchester United. After the Covid-19 induced pause of football, LASK trained a couple of days too early with full body contact. It was strongly criticised by other clubs and the media. Four points were deducted for breaching the Covid-19 rules and the club finished in fourth position in the league. On 11 July 2020, LASK parted ways with Ismaël. Dominik Thalhammer succeeded him.

=== Barnsley ===
When Gerhard Struber decided to join New York Red Bulls in autumn 2020, Barnsley hired Ismaël as his successor. He led them to a play-off position in the 2020–21 EFL Championship.

=== West Bromwich Albion ===
On 24 June 2021, Ismaël joined recently relegated Championship side West Bromwich Albion, signing a four-year contract and becoming the club's first French manager. On 2 February 2022, Ismaël left the club by mutual consent after a poor run of form.

=== Beşiktaş ===
On 25 March 2022, Ismaël became the coach of Turkish club Beşiktaş. Prior to his arrival, the team was temporarily coached by one of the youth coaches, Önder Karaveli. Ismael's contract ran until the end of the 2022–23 season.

=== Watford ===
On 10 May 2023, Ismaël joined EFL Championship club Watford as the club's new head coach, after the departure of Chris Wilder. On 9 March 2024, Ismaël was dismissed as head coach of Watford, after only one win in ten league games; his last game in charge was a 2–1 home defeat to Coventry City.

=== Blackburn Rovers ===
On 25 February 2025, Ismaël was appointed head coach of Championship club Blackburn Rovers on a three-and-half-year deal.

On 2 February 2026, Ismaël departed the club by mutual consent with Blackburn sitting in the relegation zone, three points from safety. The club had failed to win any of their last eight games.

=== Le Havre ===
On 12 November 2026, Ismaël was appointed as the new head coach of Ligue 1 side Le Havre.

== Personal life ==
Ismaël is married to his German wife Karolina. He has a son (born 1995) from his first marriage. On 25 April 2013, Ismaël received German citizenship.

== Managerial statistics ==
As of 20 November 2026

Managerial record by team and tenure
Team	From	To	Record								Ref.
Team	From	To	P	W	D	L	GF	GA	GD	Win %	Ref.
Hannover 96 II	28 November 2011	30 June 2013	49	24	10	15	94	66	+28	48.98	
VfL Wolfsburg II	1 July 2013	5 June 2014	36	23	6	7	85	29	+56	63.89	
1. FC Nürnberg	5 June 2014	10 November 2014	14	4	2	8	14	25	−11	28.57	
VfL Wolfsburg II	1 June 2015	17 October 2016	48	30	8	10	105	42	+63	62.50	
VfL Wolfsburg	17 October 2016	26 February 2017	17	6	1	10	17	26	−9	35.29	
Apollon Smyrnis	29 May 2018	31 August 2018	1	0	0	1	0	1	−1	0.00	
LASK	27 May 2019	11 July 2020	50	31	6	13	102	57	+45	62.00	
Barnsley	23 October 2020	24 June 2021	44	25	6	13	56	43	+13	56.82	
West Bromwich Albion	24 June 2021	2 February 2022	31	12	9	10	35	32	+3	38.71	
Beşiktaş	25 March 2022	26 October 2022	19	8	8	3	32	23	+9	42.11	
Watford	10 May 2023	9 March 2024	41	12	14	15	56	57	−1	29.27	
Blackburn Rovers	25 February 2025	2 February 2026	43	11	12	20	41	54	−13	25.58	
Le Havre	12 November 2026	Present	1	0	0	1	1	3	−2	0.00	
Total			394	185	82	127	637	458	+179	46.95	—

== Honours ==
=== Player ===
Strasbourg

- Coupe de France: 2000–01
- Coupe de la Ligue: 1996–97
- UEFA Intertoto Cup: 1995

Lens

- Coupe de la Ligue: 1998–99

Werder Bremen

- Bundesliga: 2003–04
- DFB-Pokal: 2003–04

Bayern Munich

- Bundesliga: 2005–06
- DFB-Pokal: 2005–06

=== Manager ===
VfL Wolfsburg II

- Regionalliga Nord: 2013–14, 2015–16
