= Rafik Mezriche =

Algerian footballer (born 1978)

Personal information
- Date of birth: 6 March 1978 (age 48)
- Place of birth: Troyes, France
- Height: 1.80 m (5 ft 11 in)
- Position: Midfielder

Senior career*
Years	Team	Apps	(Gls)
–2002	RC Strasbourg	34	(2)
2002–2004	FC Gueugnon	14	(2)
2004–2007	RCS La Chapelle		

International career
1998–2002	Algeria	4	(0)
- * Club domestic league appearances and goals

Rafik Mezriche (born 6 March 1978) is a former footballer who played as a midfielder. Born in France, he represented the Algeria national team.

== Early life ==
Mezriche was born in Troyes, France in 1978. He joined the youth academy of French side RC Strasbourg at the age of fourteen.

== Career ==
Mezriche started his career with French side RC Strasbourg. He helped the club achieve promotion. In 2002, he signed for French side FC Gueugnon. In 2004, he signed for French side RCS La Chapelle.

== Personal life ==
Mezriche has two daughters. After retiring from professional football, he worked in the restaurant industry.
