= Peguy Luyindula =

French footballer (born 1979)

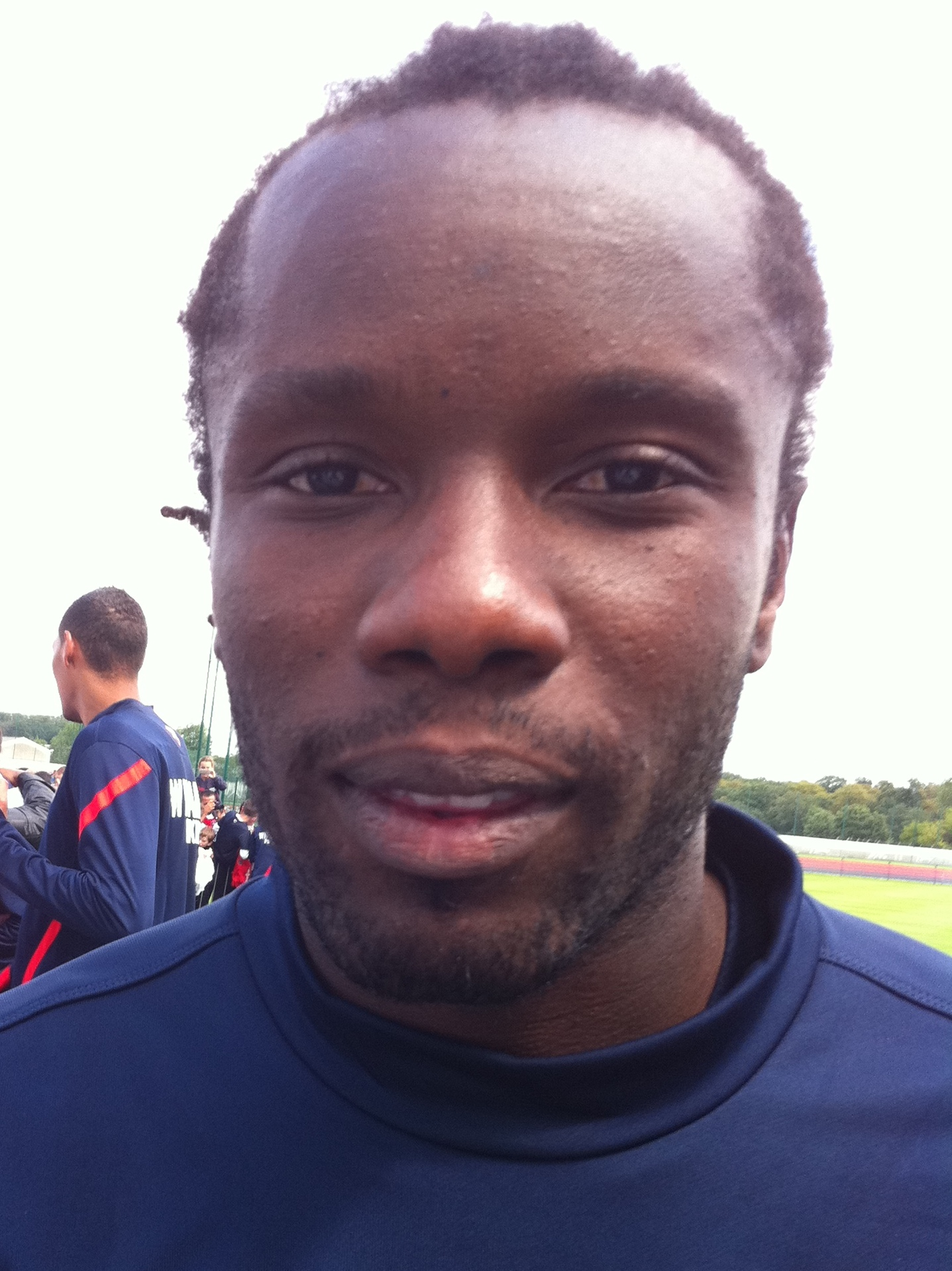
- Luyindula with Paris Saint-Germain in 2011

Personal information
- Full name: Guy Luyindula Makanda
- Date of birth: 25 May 1979 (age 47)
- Place of birth: Kinshasa, Zaire
- Height: 1.78 m (5 ft 10 in)
- Position: Forward

Senior career*
Years	Team	Apps	(Gls)
1997–1998	Niort	27	(8)
1998–2001	Strasbourg	85	(19)
2002–2004	Lyon	91	(33)
2004–2007	Marseille	37	(10)
2005–2006	→ Auxerre (loan)	33	(10)
2006–2007	→ Levante (loan)	10	(0)
2007–2012	Paris Saint-Germain	130	(19)
2013–2014	New York Red Bulls	48	(6)
Total		461	(105)

International career
1999–2002	France U21	26	(14)
2004–2009	France	6	(1)
Medal record
Men's football
Representing France
UEFA European Under-21 Championship
Runner-up	2002
- * Club domestic league appearances and goals

Guy Luyindula Makanda (born 25 May 1979), known as Peguy Luyindula, is a former professional footballer who played as a forward. Born in Zaire, he represented France at international level.

== Club career ==
=== Early career ===
Luyindula began his career at Niort joining at the age of 18. In his first professional season scored eight goals where he caught the eye of Strasbourg. He joined Strasbourg in 1998 and went on to score 19 league goals in 85 matches. Luyindula also helped Strasbourg in capturing the 2001 Coupe de France. On 2 February 2000, he scored a hattrick as Strasbourg beat Lyon. During this time he earned a reputation as one of the hottest prospects in French football.

=== Lyon ===
Luyindula continued his progress up the football ladder after coming to the attention of French giants Lyon. In January 2002 he completed a £5.5 million transfer to Lyon and continued his good form scoring 6 goals and helping Lyon win the French league. He remained at Lyon for the next two season winning two more league championships. He had his most productive season in 2003–04 as he scored 16 league goals helping Lyon to the Ligue 1 title. On 24 May 2004, he scored the third goal in a 3–0 win against Lille which secured the championship.

=== Marseille ===
Following the club record sale of Didier Drogba for £24 million to Chelsea, Marseille set their sights on Luyindula as a replacement. Although Luyindula expressed his desire to remain at Lyon and despite their recent success the club still suffered from financial troubles and a sale looked probable. Eventually he completed a £7.5 million move to l'OM.

He quickly found himself out of favour at the Vélodrome, in spite of being the club's best goalscorer for 2004–05. Loaned out to AJ Auxerre, where he reunited with his former Lyon coach Jacques Santini, during the 2005–06 season, Luyindula failed to convince the club to keep him on a permanent basis. In the summer of 2006, he thus moved back to Marseille and found himself on the fringes of the first team, before another loan move materialized, this time to Spanish club Levante UD. He joined the club for the 2006–07 season. On 1 February 2007, the loan was cut short.

=== Paris Saint-Germain ===
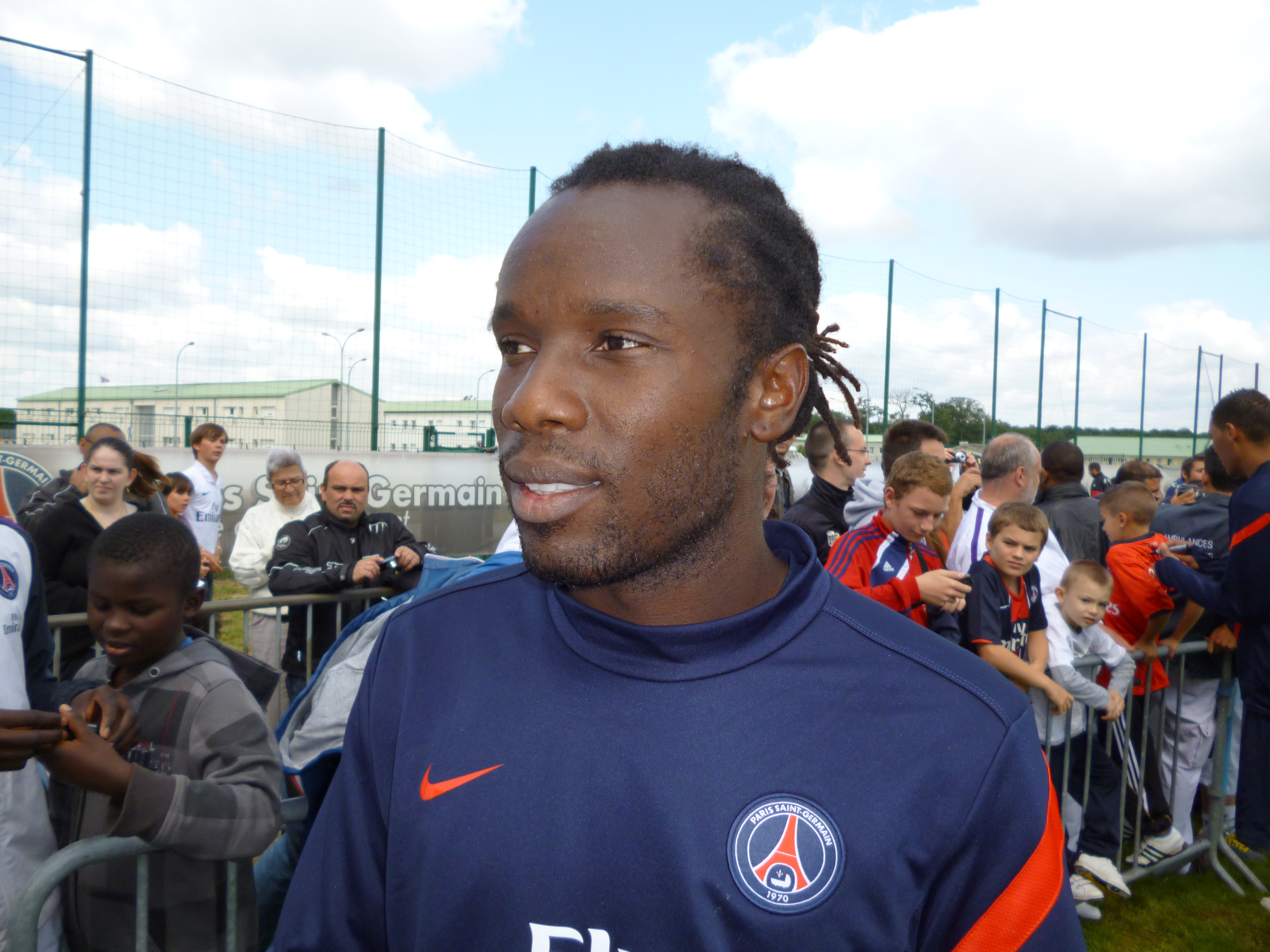
Luyindula with Paris Saint-Germain in 2011

On 1 February 2007, the same day his loan with Levante was terminated, Luyindula moved to Paris Saint-Germain, joining on a 3 1/2-year contract. As part of the deal, it was agreed he would not make his debut in the following match against Marseille. He debuted for Paris Saint-Germain on 10 February 2007, and netted his first goal two months later against Le Mans, in a crucial game for the battle against relegation. Before the season ended, he scored two more against the likes of Toulouse and Nantes to keep French capital club in the top flight.

In the summer of 2007, the Parisian club purchased Luyindula on a definite basis. The club endured a horrendous 2007–08 campaign, only avoiding relegation on the last day of the season. Luydindula scored just 5 goals during the whole season, and became something of a hate figure among PSG fans.

The 2008–09 season proved to be much more positive for the Kinshasa-born forward. With the arrival of no less than four attacking reinforcements (Ludovic Giuly, Guillaume Hoarau, Stéphane Sessègnon and Mateja Kežman) in the summer, Luyindula lost his spot in the starting line-up. However, he was often used as a supersub, especially in UEFA Cup games, and appeared to play better without the pressure of being an automatic starter. He scored twice in a 4–0 win over Dutch club FC Twente in December 2008, which qualified the Parisian club for the following round of the UEFA Cup.

In September 2009, Luyindula signed a two-year extension to his deal with the club, this tied him to the club until 2012. During the 2011–12 campaign Luyindula had a falling out with manager Antoine Kombouare and as a result was relegated to the reserve side. He was reinstated to the first team under new manager Carlo Ancelotti but only appeared in one League Cup match in 2012. During his time with PSG Luyindula played in 180 official matches and scored 37 goals.

=== New York Red Bulls ===
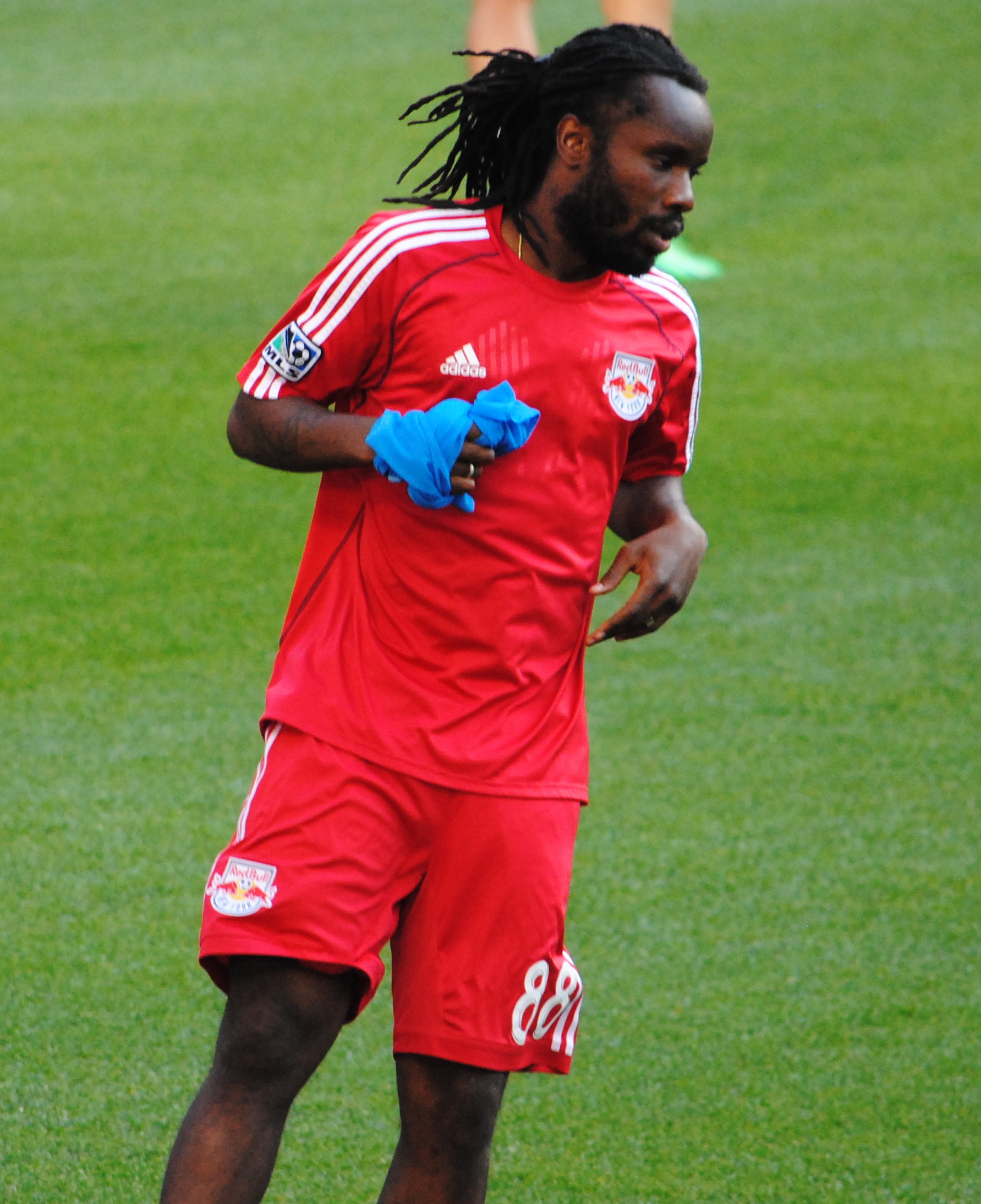
Luyindula training with New York Red Bulls in 2013

In December 2012 it was reported that Luyindula would be terminating his contract with PSG to sign with New York Red Bulls. New York officially announced Luyindula's signing with the club on 19 March 2013. Luyindula scored his first goal for his new club on 13 July against Montreal Impact. In his first year with New York Luyindula appeared in 22 league matches and scored 1 goal and was second on the team in assists with 7. During the season he started to play as a central midfielder and was instrumental in New York capturing the Supporters' Shield on the last day of the season as he assisted on three of the club's goals in a 5–2 victory over Chicago Fire. In his second season with New York Luyindula was a key figure in helping the club reach the league playoffs as he appeared in 26 league matches scoring 5 goals. He was a key player for New York during the MLS playoffs assisting on two goals in the team's come from behind 2–1 victory over Sporting Kansas City in the play-in match, and scoring two goals in New York's series aggregate victory of 3–2 over rivals D.C. United which sent the club to the Eastern Conference final.

== International career ==
Luyindula was capped six times and scored his lone goal for the France national team in a 2004 friendly match against Bosnia and Herzegovina. In 2009, Luyindula briefly revived his international career by starting two games on the right-wing against Lithuania in France's 2010 World Cup Qualification campaign.

== Post-playing career ==
In July 2019 Luyindula joined Dijon FCO's management as a "strategic advisor".

== Career statistics ==
=== Club ===
Appearances and goals by club, season and competition
Club	Season	League			National cup		League cup		Continental		Other		Total	
Club	Season	Division	Apps	Goals	Apps	Goals	Apps	Goals	Apps	Goals	Apps	Goals	Apps	Goals
Niort	1997–98	Ligue 2	27	8	1	0	3	0	–		–		31	8
Strasbourg	1998–99	Ligue 1	18	0	2	0	1	0	–		–		21	0
Strasbourg	1999–2000	Ligue 1	30	7	4	1	3	0	–		–		37	8
Strasbourg	2000–01	Ligue 1	31	7	6	4	1	2	–		–		38	13
Strasbourg	2001–02	Ligue 2	6	5	0	0			–		1 (Note: Appearance in Trophée des Champions)	0	7	5
Strasbourg	Total		85	19	12	5	5	2	0	0	1	0	103	26
Lyon	2001–02	Ligue 1	21	6	2	2	2	1	8	2	–		33	11
Lyon	2002–03	Ligue 1	33	11	1	0	2	3	5	1	1	1	42	16
Lyon	2003–04	Ligue 1	37	16	3	0	1	1	10	2	–		51	19
Lyon	Total		91	33	6	2	5	5	23	5	1	1	126	46
Marseille	2004–05	Ligue 1	35	10	1	0	1	0	–		–		37	10
Marseille	2005–06	Ligue 1	2	0	0	0	0	0	3	1	–		5	1
Marseille	Total		37	10	1	0	1	0	3	1	0	0	42	11
Auxerre (loan)	2005–06	Ligue 1	33	10	2	0	2	0	–		–		37	10
Levante (loan)	2006–07	La Liga	10	0	2	0	–		–		–		12	0
Paris Saint-Germain	2006–07	Ligue 1	14	3	–		–		4	0	–		18	3
Paris Saint-Germain	2007–08	Ligue 1	31	5	4	0	3	0	–		–		38	5
Paris Saint-Germain	2008–09	Ligue 1	34	5	1	0	4	2	12	6	–		51	13
Paris Saint-Germain	2009–10	Ligue 1	28	6	2	2	1	0	–		–		31	8
Paris Saint-Germain	2010–11	Ligue 1	23	0	4	3	2	1	11	4	1	0	41	8
Paris Saint-Germain	2011–12	Ligue 1	0	0	0	0	0	0	0	0	–		0	0
Paris Saint-Germain	2012–13	Ligue 1	0	0	0	0	1	0	0	0	–		1	0
Paris Saint-Germain	Total		130	19	11	5	11	3	27	10	1	0	180	37
New York Red Bulls	2013	Major League Soccer	22	1	2	0	–		–		2 (Note: Appearances in MLS Cup Playoffs)	0	26	1
New York Red Bulls	2014	Major League Soccer	26	5	1	0	–		2	0	5	3	34	8
New York Red Bulls	Total		48	6	3	0	0	0	2	0	7	3	60	9
Total			461	105	38	12	27	10	55	16	10	4	591	147

=== International ===
Scores and results list France's goal tally first, score column indicates score after Luyindula goal.

International goal scored by Peguy Luyindula
No.	Date	Venue	Opponent	Score	Result	Competition
1	18 August 2004	Stade de la Route de Lorient, Rennes, France	Bosnia and Herzegovina	1–0	1–1	Friendly

== Honours ==
Strasbourg

- Coupe de France: 2000–01

Lyon

- Division/Ligue 1: 2001–02, 2002–03, 2003–04
- Trophée des Champions: 2002

Paris Saint-Germain

- Coupe de France: 2009–10
- Coupe de la Ligue: 2007–08

New York Red Bulls

- Supporters' Shield: 2013

Individual

- UNFP Ligue 1 Player of the Month: January 2005, April 2007, January 2009
