= Gilles Doucende =

French professional football player (born 1977)

Personal information
- Date of birth: January 6, 1977 (age 49)
- Place of birth: Cavaillon, France
- Height: 1.73 m (5 ft 8 in)
- Position: Midfielder

Team information
- Current team: US Le Pontet

Senior career*
Years	Team	Apps	(Gls)
1994–1998	Nice (B team)		
1995–1998	Nice	7	(0)
1998–1999	FC Villefranche		
1999–2002	Grenoble		
2002–2005	SC Orange		
2005–	US Le Pontet		
- * Club domestic league appearances and goals as of 15:42, 25 November 2009 (UTC)

Gilles Doucende (born January 6, 1977) is a French former professional footballer who played in Ligue 1 and Ligue 2 for OGC Nice.
