= Cyrille Courtin =

French footballer (born 1971)

Personal information
- Full name: Cyrille Courtin
- Date of birth: 10 November 1971 (age 54)
- Place of birth: Fontenay-le-Comte, France
- Height: 1.88 m (6 ft 2 in)
- Position: Defender

Senior career*
| Years | Team | Apps | (Gls) |
| 1989–1997 | Chamois Niortais | 196 | (7) |
| 1997–1999 | Beauvais | 71 | (5) |
| 1999–2003 | Grenoble | 123 | (9) |
- * Club domestic league appearances and goals

Cyrille Courtin (born 10 November 1971) is a former professional footballer. He played as a defender.
