= Yannick Fischer =

French footballer (born 1974)

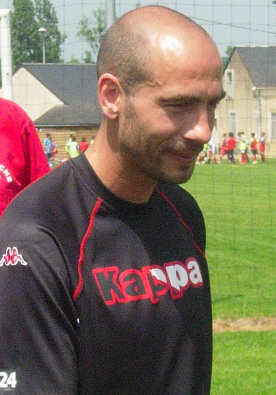
- Fischer

Personal information
- Full name: Yannick Fischer
- Date of birth: 17 December 1974 (age 51)
- Place of birth: Sainte-Foy-la-Grande, France
- Height: 1.81 m (5 ft 11 in)
- Position: Defender

Senior career*
Years	Team	Apps	(Gls)
1993–1996	Bordeaux	45	(1)
1996–1998	Cannes	58	(0)
1998–2000	Marseille	22	(0)
1998–1999	→ Lorient (loan)	30	(1)
2000–2003	Strasbourg	79	(1)
2003–2007	Le Mans	79	(1)
2007–2009	Chamois Niortais	58	(1)
Total		371	(5)
- * Club domestic league appearances and goals

Yannick Fischer, born 17 December 1974 in Sainte-Foy-la-Grande is a French former professional footballer who played as a defender.

Fischer counts Girondins Bordeaux and Olympique de Marseille as his former clubs. Whilst at Strasbourg he played in the 2001 Coupe de France Final in which they beat Amiens SC on penalties.
