= Xavier Dablemont =

French footballer (born 1975)

Personal information
- Date of birth: 10 June 1975 (age 51)
- Place of birth: Arras, France
- Height: 1.82 m (6 ft 0 in)
- Position: Midfielder

Senior career*
| Years | Team | Apps | (Gls) |
| 1992–1996 | Lens | | |
| 1996–1997 | Le Mans | 32 | (0) |
| 1997–1998 | Gueugnon | 39 | (6) |
| 1998–1999 | Wasquehal | 29 | (1) |
| 1999–2001 | Lorient | 39 | (3) |
| 2001–2002 | Grenoble | 13 | (0) |
| 2002–2003 | Rouen | | |
| 2003–2005 | Vendée Fontenay | | |
- * Club domestic league appearances and goals

Xavier Dablemont (born 10 June 1975) is a French former footballer who played as a midfielder.
