= Gharib Amzine =

Moroccan footballer and manager (born 1973)

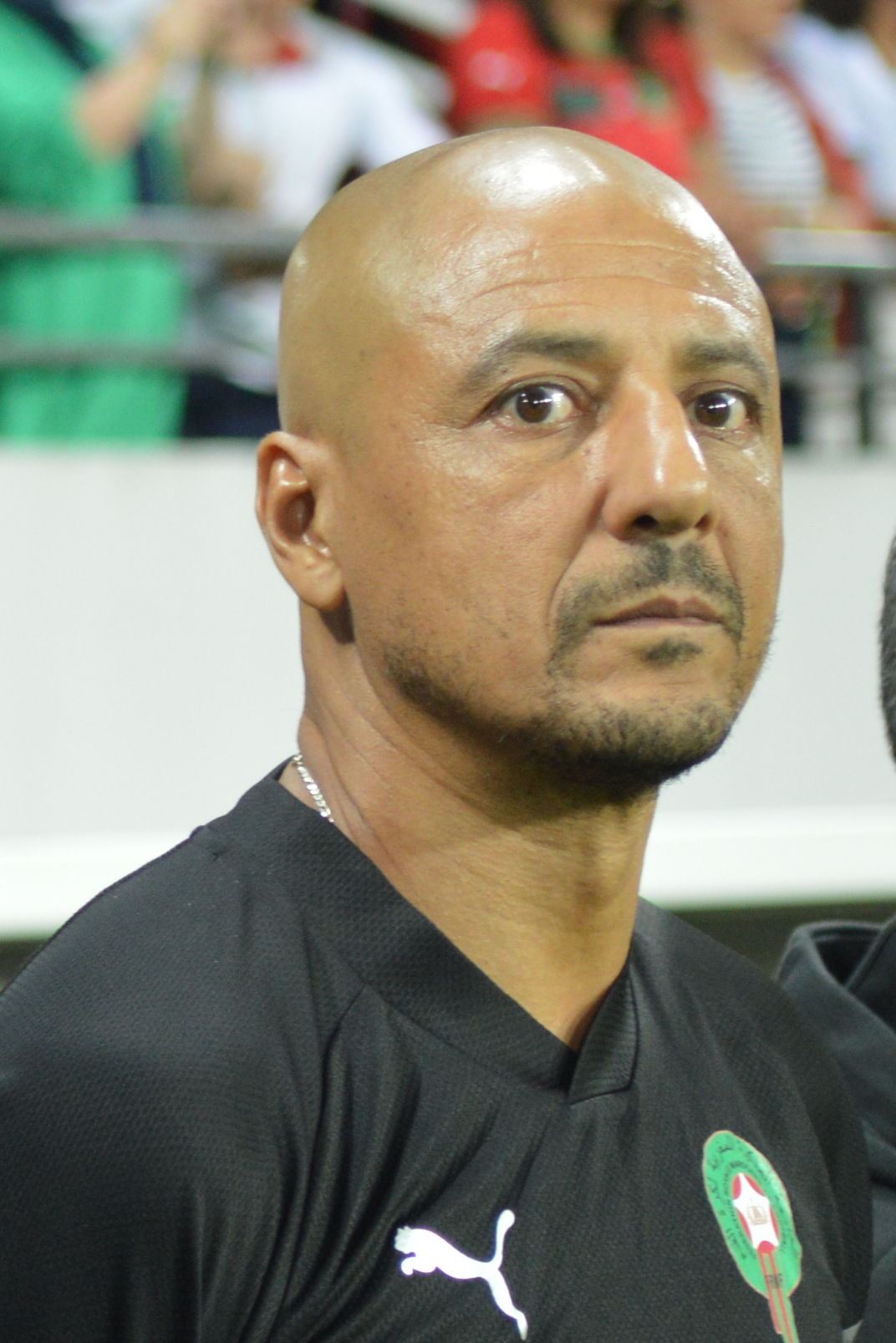
- Amzine with Morocco in 2023

Personal information
- Date of birth: May 3, 1973 (age 53)
- Place of birth: Montbéliard, France
- Height: 1.78 m (5 ft 10 in)
- Position: Midfielder

Team information
- Current team: Morocco (assistant)

Senior career*
Years	Team	Apps	(Gls)
1994–1998	Mulhouse	116	(7)
1998–2001	Strasbourg	44	(2)
2001–2008	Troyes	203	(9)
2008–2010	Mulhouse	55	(3)
Total		418	(21)

International career
1997–2006	Morocco	24	(1)

Managerial career
- 2013–2015: Mulhouse
- 2015–2022: Troyes (assistant)
- 2022–2024: Morocco (assistant)
- * Club domestic league appearances and goals

Gharib Amzine (Arabic: غريب أمزين; born 3 May 1973) is a professional football manager and former player who played as a midfielder. He was working as an assistant manager for the Morocco national team between 2022 and 2024.

== Playing career ==
Amzine made over 200 competitive appearances for Troyes, making him the club's most capped player as of March 2008.

Whilst at Strasbourg, Amzine played in the 2001 Coupe de France Final in which they beat Amiens SC on penalties.

Born in France, Amzine played for the Morocco national team and was a participant at the 1998 FIFA World Cup.

== Managerial career ==
Amzine managied Mulhouse from 2013 to 2015.

== Career statistics ==
Scores and results list Morocco's goal tally first.

No	Date	Venue	Opponent	Score	Result	Competition
1.	3 May 2001	July 5, 1962 Stadium, Algiers, Algeria	Algeria	2–1	2–1	2002 FIFA World Cup qualification
