= Jean-Paul Abalo =

Togolese footballer (born 1975)

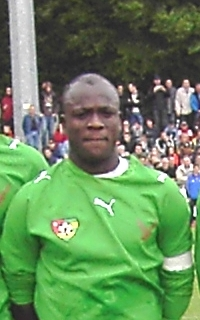

Personal information
- Full name: Jean-Paul Dosseh Abalo
- Birth name: Yaovi Dosseh Abalo
- Date of birth: 26 June 1975 (age 51)
- Place of birth: Lomé, Togo
- Height: 1.77 m (5 ft 9 1/2 in)
- Position: Defender

Youth career
- 1991–1992: OC Agaza

Senior career*
Years	Team	Apps	(Gls)
1992–1993	OC Agaza		
1993–1995	Saint-Christophe Châteauroux	29	(1)
1995–2005	Amiens SC	273	(7)
2005	USL Dunkerque	4	(0)
2006	APOEL	3	(0)
2006	Ethnikos Piraeus	9	(0)
2007–2008	Al-Merrikh		
2008–2009	FC Déols 36		

International career^{‡}
1992–2008	Togo	74	(1)

Managerial career
- 2018–: Togo U20
- * Club domestic league appearances and goals as of 11 April 2007 ‡ National team caps and goals as of 23 June 2006

Jean-Paul Yaovi Dosseh Abalo (born 26 June 1975) is a Togolese former footballer who played as a defender. He is the current coach of the Togo national under-20 football team.

== Club career ==
Abalo played for six seasons in the French Ligue 2 with Amiens SC. (Note: Jean-Paul Abalo – French league stats at LFP – also available in French (archived)) He acquired French nationality by naturalization on 29 January 1998 and legally changed his name from Yaovi to Jean-Paul.

In 2006, he moved to APOEL in Cyprus, where he won the 2005–06 Cypriot Cup. Whilst at Amiens, Abalo played in the 2001 Coupe de France Final. His penalty miss proved decisive as Amiens lost to Strasbourg.

== International career ==
Abalo was the captain of the Togo national football team. He was called up to the 2006 World Cup, and represented his country at four Africa Cup of Nations tournaments. His contribution to the team's World Cup campaign was overshadowed by the red card he received in the opening match against South Korea, as his side suffered a 1–2 defeat.

== Coaching career ==
In January 2018, Abalo was announced as the Togo national under-20 football team coach for the 2018 Toulon Tournament.

== Honours ==
APOEL

- Cypriot Cup: 2005–06
