= Teddy Bertin =

French footballer and manager (born 1969)

Personal information
- Date of birth: 6 August 1969 (age 57)
- Place of birth: Flixecourt, Somme, France
- Height: 1.81 m (5 ft 11 in)
- Position: Defender

Senior career*
Years	Team	Apps	(Gls)
1990–1991	Amiens		
1991–1997	Le Havre	187	(18)
1997–1998	Marseille	21	(0)
1998–2003	Strasbourg	152	(23)
2003–2007	Châteauroux	137	(18)
2007-2009	AS Cozes		
2009–2011	AC Amiens		
2011–2012	Eu F.C.		
Total		497	(59)

Managerial career
- 2012–2013: AM Neiges
- 2013–2019: Amiens (U19)
- 2019–2020: AC Boulogne-Billancourt
- 2020–2021: AS Beauvais B
- 2021–2022: Olympique Saint-Quentin
- 2023–2024: Toulon
- * Club domestic league appearances and goals

Teddy Bertin (born 6 August 1969) is a French football manager and former player who most recently managed Toulon.

Bertin mostly played for Le Havre, Marseille and Strasbourg.

Whilst at Strasbourg, Bertin played in the 2001 Coupe de France Final in which the Alsatians defeated Amiens on penalties.
