= Emmanuel Duchemin =

French footballer (born 1979)

Personal information
- Date of birth: 14 March 1979 (age 47)
- Place of birth: Amiens, France
- Height: 1.77 m (5 ft 10 in)
- Position: Midfielder

Youth career
- 1997-1998: Amiens

Senior career*
Years	Team	Apps	(Gls)
1997–2003	Amiens	159	(4)
2003–2008	Nancy	88	(5)
Total		247	(9)
- * Club domestic league appearances and goals

Emmanuel Duchemin (born 14 March 1979) is a French former professional footballer who played defensive midfielder.

== Career ==
Duchemin joined his first club, Aimens SC, in 1997.

He remained there until 2003 before leaving for Tomblaine based club AS Nancy-Lorraine.

Duchemin was forced to retire due to injury problems in 2008.

== Honours ==
Nancy

- Coupe de la Ligue: 2005–06
