= Pascal Johansen =

French former professional footballer (born 1979)

Personal information
- Date of birth: 28 April 1979 (age 47)
- Place of birth: Colmar, France
- Height: 1.77 m (5 ft 10 in)
- Position: Midfielder

Youth career
- SR Colmar

Senior career*
Years	Team	Apps	(Gls)
1999–2002	Strasbourg	73	(3)
2002–2004	Marseille	46	(2)
2004–2008	Strasbourg	102	(5)
2008–2010	Metz	44	(7)
2010–2011	Grenoble	16	(1)
2011–2013	Mulhouse	38	(5)
2013–2015	US Raon-l'Étape	31	(0)
Total		350	(23)

International career
2001	France U23		
- * Club domestic league appearances and goals

Pascal Johansen (born 28 April 1979) is a French former professional footballer who played as a midfielder.

== Career ==
Pascal Johansen was born in Colmar, Alsace. He is a younger brother to Frédéric Johansen, former player of FC Mulhouse and one of France's most promiseful prospects, who died in a car crash in 1992. Johansen followed his brothers' footsteps, also becoming a footballer, and was signed by RC Strasbourg as a youngster. He made his first pro appearance against harsh rivals FC Metz on 15 January 2000 and quickly established himself as a regular first team player at the age of 21. The following season he was among the rare satisfactions in a team that won the Coupe de France but was relegated to Ligue 2 after a terrible season in the league. Johansen played the full match in the 2001 Coupe de France Final in which they beat Amiens SC on penalties.

In 2002, after Strasbourg earned promotion from Ligue 2, Johansen was transferred to Olympique Marseille. His first season was successful with the club earning a Champions League berth. Early in the 2003–04 season, OM manager Alain Perrin, who had recruited Johansen to Marseille, was sacked and replaced by José Anigo. This change relegated Johansen of the bench and he did not take part in Marseille's 2004 UEFA Cup final when they reached the finals against Valencia FC. Johansen subsequently went back, on loan, to Strasbourg for the 2004–2005 season, winning the Coupe de la Ligue.

He was then definitively transferred, but struggled in a team that was again relegated at the end of the 2005–2006 season. Strasbourg regained immediately its place in France's top division after only one year at the lower stage with Johansen as a regular team member in the second half of the season.
