= 2000–01 Coupe de la Ligue =

French League Cup

Tournament details
- Country: France
- Dates: 1 November 2000 – 5 May 2001
- Teams: 43

Final positions
- Champions: Lyon (1st title)
- Runners-up: Monaco

Tournament statistics
- Matches played: 41
- Goals scored: 134 (3.27 per match)
- Top goal scorer: Emmerick Darbelet (4 goals)

The 2000–01 Coupe de la Ligue began on 1 November 2000 and the final took place on 5 May 2001 at the Stade de France. Gueugnon were the defending champions, but were knocked-out by Monaco in the Second round. Lyon went on to win the tournament, beating Monaco 2–1 after extra time in the final.

== First round ==
The matches were played on 1 and 8 November 2000.

Team 1	Score	Team 2
Nancy	1–0	Sochaux
Red Star	5–2	Lorient
Le Havre	3–3 (a.e.t.) (5–3 p)	Laval
Cannes	3–0	Montpellier
Nîmes	4–2	Angers
Louhans-Cuiseaux	1–3	Créteil
Amiens	4–2 (a.e.t.)	Le Mans
Valence	2–0	Beauvais
Martigues	0–3	Châteauroux
Wasquehal	2–1	Caen

== Second round ==
The matches were played on 5, 6, and 7 January 2001.

Team 1	Score	Team 2
Rennes	2–4 (a.e.t.)	Nantes
Cannes	1–2	Valence
Le Havre	4–1	Marseille
Bordeaux	1–0	Lille
Ajaccio	1–2 (a.e.t.)	Saint-Étienne
Guingamp	1–3	Amiens
Toulouse	0–1	Niort
Auxerre	2–0	Red Star
Sedan	1–2	Lyon
Nancy	3–1	Paris Saint-Germain
Wasquehal	3–1	Metz
Strasbourg	2–4 (a.e.t.)	Châteauroux
Monaco	2–0	Gueugnon
Troyes	3–0	Créteil
Lens	4–0	Nîmes
Bastia	2–1	Nice

== Round of 16 ==
The matches were played on 30 and 31 January 2001.

Team 1	Score	Team 2
Châteauroux	1–0	Bordeaux
Monaco	2–1	Bastia
Niort	1–0	Le Havre
Saint-Étienne	2–0	Auxerre
Amiens	3–2 (a.e.t.)	Wasquehal
Lens	1–3	Lyon
Troyes	2–0	Nancy
Valence	1–1 (a.e.t.) (2–4 p)	Nantes

== Quarter-finals ==
The matches were played on 24, 25 February and 13 March 2001.

Team 1	Score	Team 2
Châteauroux	0–1	Monaco
Niort	3–2	Saint-Étienne
Amiens	0–2	Lyon
Troyes	0–1	Nantes

== Semi-finals ==
The matches were played on 10 and 11 April 2001.

Team 1	Score	Team 2
Monaco	2–0	Niort
Lyon	3–2	Nantes

== Final ==
The final was played on 5 May 2001 at the Stade de France.

5 May 2001
20:45

Lyon	2–1 (a.e.t.)	Monaco
Caçapa 35'; Müller 118'		Nonda 64'

Stade de France, Saint-Denis
Attendance: 78,010
Referee: Stéphane Bré
