= Laurent Debrosse =

French footballer (born 1969)

Personal information
- Full name: Laurent Debrosse
- Date of birth: October 2, 1969 (age 57)
- Place of birth: Saint-Vallier, Saône-et-Loire, France
- Height: 1.85 m (6 ft 1 in)
- Position: Midfielder

Senior career*
Years	Team	Apps	(Gls)
1989–1994	Lyon	82	(2)
1994–1996	Dunkerque	79	(3)
1996–1998	Châteauroux	63	(1)
1998–2000	Chamois Niortais	51	(2)
2000–2003	Grenoble	100	(6)
- * Club domestic league appearances and goals

Laurent Debrosse (born October 2, 1969) is a French former professional footballer. He played as a midfielder.
