= Laurent Strzelczak =

French footballer (born 1971)

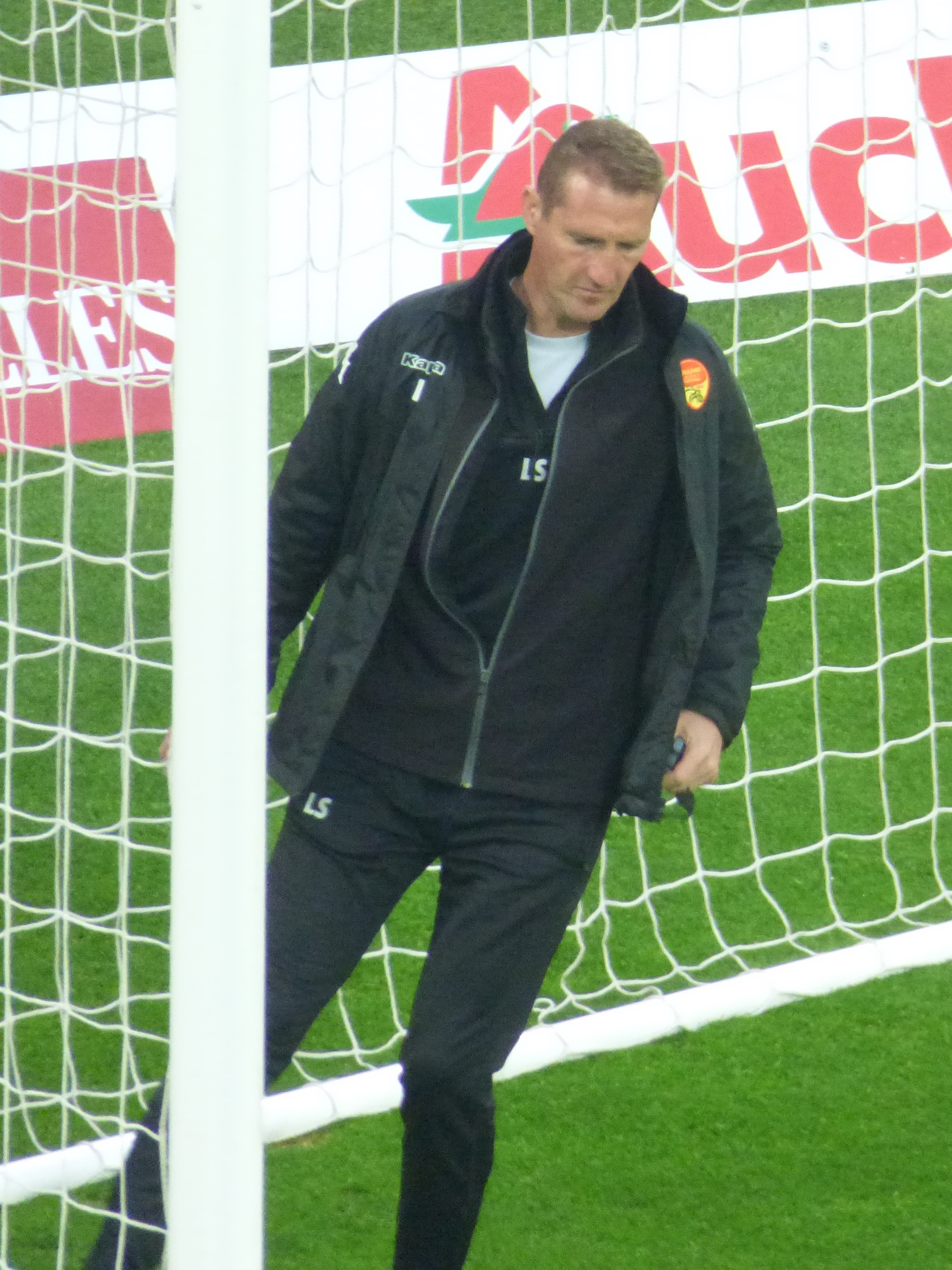
- Strzelczak with Orléans in 2019

Personal information
- Date of birth: 19 February 1971 (age 55)
- Place of birth: Bondy, France
- Height: 1.87 m (6 ft 2 in)
- Position: Defender

Senior career*
Years	Team	Apps	(Gls)
1991–1996	Laval	145	(5)
1996–1998	Toulouse	46	(2)
1998–2000	Nîmes	67	(1)
2000–2002	Amiens	67	(4)
2002–2003	Wasquehal	21	(0)
2003–2005	Bayonne		
Total		360+	(12+)

International career
	France Military	3	(1)

Managerial career
- 2006–2007: Bayonne U18
- 2007–2008: Beauvais (assistant)
- 2011: Tarbes
- 2012–2014: Pau
- 2016–2021: Orléans (assistant)
- * Club domestic league appearances and goals

Laurent Strzelczak (born 19 February 1971) is a French professional football manager and former player who played as a defender. He was most recently an assistant coach at Championnat National club Orléans. Across his playing career, he made over 360 senior appearances.

== Post-playing career ==
Strzelczak retired from football in 2005. He was the head coach of Bayonne's under-18 side from July 2006 to June 2007, and an assistant coach at Beauvais from July 2007 to June 2008. From July 2008 to June 2011, he worked as a scout for Athletic Bilbao. In 2011, he was briefly the head coach of Tarbes before integrating the club's managerial staff for the 2011–12 season.

From July 2012 to November 2014, Strzelczak was the head coach of Pau. In 2016, he joined Orléans as an assistant coach. He worked with four different coaches across his spell at the club before leaving in 2021 following the expiration of his contract.

== Honours ==
Amiens

- Coupe de France runner-up: 2000–01
