= Peter Sampil =

French footballer (born 1974)

Personal information
- Date of birth: 22 November 1974 (age 51)
- Place of birth: Rambouillet, France
- Height: 1.87 m (6 ft 2 in)
- Position: Striker

Youth career
- 1992–1993: Racing 92

Senior career*
Years	Team	Apps	(Gls)
1993–1995	Paris Saint-Germain B	22	(3)
1995–1996	Rouen	25	(6)
1996–1997	Vallée d’Eure	28	(0)
1997–1999	Istres	61	(25)
1999–2000	Beauvais	36	(11)
2000–2002	Amiens	60	(18)
2002–2004	Angers	50	(12)
2005–2006	Dieppe	18	(0)
2006–2008	Romorantin	33	(5)
2008–2009	US La Baule Le Pouliguen		
Total		333+	(80+)

Managerial career
- 2015–2017: SC Beaucouzé B
- * Club domestic league appearances and goals

Peter Sampil (born 22 November 1974) is a French former professional footballer who played as a striker. In his career, he made over 300 appearances and scored over 80 goals in the second, third, and fourth tiers of French football.

== Post-playing career ==
Sampil retired from football in 2009. From 2015 to 2017, he was the head coach of the reserve side of SC Beaucouzé. From 2017 to 2019, he was a member of the first team’s managerial staff.

== Honours ==
Beauvais

- Championnat National: 1999–2000

Amiens

- Coupe de France runner-up: 2000–01
