= Danijel Ljuboja =

Serbian footballer (born 1978)

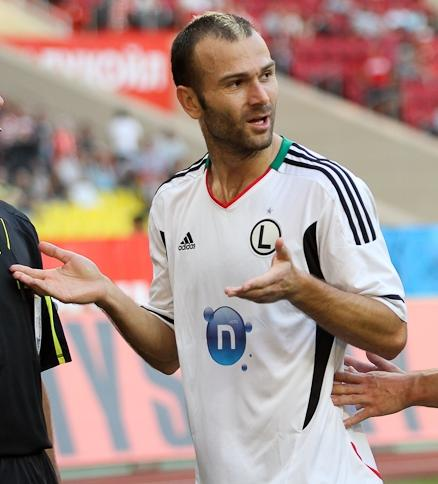
- Ljuboja with Legia Warsaw in 2011

Personal information
- Full name: Danijel Ljuboja
- Date of birth: 4 September 1978 (age 48)
- Place of birth: Vinkovci, SR Croatia, SFR Yugoslavia
- Height: 1.89 m (6 ft 2 in)
- Position: Forward

Youth career
- Dinamo Vinkovci
- Osijek
- Red Star Belgrade
- Sochaux

Senior career*
Years	Team	Apps	(Gls)
1998–2000	Sochaux	62	(21)
2000–2004	Strasbourg	121	(34)
2004–2005	Paris Saint-Germain	42	(7)
2005–2009	VfB Stuttgart	29	(8)
2006–2007	→ Hamburger SV (loan)	16	(5)
2008	→ VfL Wolfsburg (loan)	8	(1)
2009–2010	Grenoble	37	(10)
2010–2011	Nice	30	(5)
2011–2013	Legia Warsaw	56	(23)
2013–2014	Lens	30	(8)
Total		431	(122)

International career
2003–2006	Serbia (Note: Including 17 caps and 1 goal for Serbia and Montenegro)	19	(1)
- * Club domestic league appearances and goals

Danijel Ljuboja (Serbian Cyrillic: Данијел Љубоја, pronounced [dǎnijel ʎûboja]; born 4 September 1978) is a Serbian former professional footballer who played as a forward.

He was known for his passing and set pieces. He represented Serbia and Montenegro at the 2006 FIFA World Cup.

== Career ==
=== Club ===
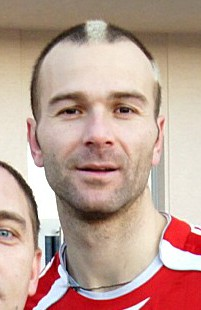
Ljuboja with a fan at Legia Warsaw.

Ljuboja was born in Vinkovci, SR Croatia, SFR Yugoslavia to Serb parents. There he played in the youth teams of NK Dinamo Vinkovci, NK Osijek and Red Star Belgrade. He moved to France where his professional career started with Sochaux in the 1998–99 season. Ljuboja made his debut, coming on as a substitute in the 76th minutes for Anthony Sirufo, in a 2–1 loss against Lyon on 11 September 1998; then on 31 October 1998, Ljuboja scored his first goal and scored another, in a 4–0 win over Montpellier. However, in his first season, Sochaux was relegated to Ligue 2. The next season, Ljuboja soon became an important member of the first team and began his goalscoring form, including a hat-trick in a 5–1 win over Créteil on 15 April 2000. At the end of the season, Ljuboja's goalscoring form led him to become a top-scorer for the club, but he was second top-scorer behind Amara Traoré. However, the club wasn't able to return to Ligue 1, having come one point too short. In his two-year stint with the team, he played 62 games scoring 20 goals.

Following his stay with Sochaux, Ljuboja moved to Strasbourg in the 2000–01 season. In his first season, he made a slow start, scoring three goals in thirty appearances. The club was relegated despite winning the Coupe de France final, beating Amiens 5–4 on penalties. Soon in his second season, Ljuboja was able to bounce back, scoring fifteen goals and the club to return to Ligue 1. He also made two appearances in the UEFA Cup competition, scoring twice against Belgian side Standard Liège but the club was knocked out, having lost 2–0 in the first leg. Strasbourg was explained, due to winning the Coupe de France, the previous season. The next season, in which the French League was renamed to Ligue 1, Ljuboja's goalscoring form soon faded, with nine goals but the club still remained in Ligue 1. The season after, Ljuboja soon formed an important strike partnership with newly signing Mamadou Niang, which was short-lived as he moved from Strasbourg to PSG. Because of his departure, Niang didn't score again for the remainder of the second half of that season. Upon his departure, Ljuboja had made 121 league appearances scoring 34 goals in total. In December 2003, Ljuboja was linked with Ligue 1 rival Paris Saint-Germain and two unknown Premier League clubs.

=== Paris Saint-Germain ===
During the 2003–4 January transfer window, Ljuboja moved from Strasbourg to Paris Saint-Germain for a €3.000.000 fee. In his first half of the season at PSG, Ljuboja made a good start, scoring six goals, including four goals in three consecutive games. Also, his new club was able to win the Coupe de France, beating Châteauroux 1–0. During his time at PSG, he faced competition from strikers like Pauleta and Fabrice Pancrate.

Ahead of the 2004–05 season, Ljuboja soon had a rift with manager Vahid Halilhodžić after Halilhodžic was far from happy with Ljuboja's attitude in pre-season training, resulting not trained for the past two days due to a back complaint. This led a transfer speculation by moving to Monaco. Despite the strained relationship, Ljuboja first team wasn't affected. However, in September 2004, Ljuboja was disgusted with Halilhodžic after he wasn't included in a match against Monaco and was omitted from the first team despite lack of attackers at the club. Ljuboja told L'Equipe that Halilhodžic didn't give him explanations ahead of a match and that he was 100 percent committed at PSG. In January transfer window, with PSG announcing their intentions to sell Ljuboja, Ljuboja was linked with clubs around Europe like Barcelona, Málaga, Southampton and Tottenham Hotspur. However, no move was made as Ljuboja desired to stay at the club.

His 2004–05 season wasn't a success as he scored twice and his form was declining and the club finished in the ninth place. During the season, he played five games with the team in the UEFA Champions League. He scored seven times in 42 league appearances.

=== Joining the German clubs ===
In 2005, he transferred to German club side Stuttgart, at first on loan, having been linked with clubs like Mallorca, Marseille and Bolton. After joining Stuttgart, Ljuboja said he left PSG, not for the revenge he received last season but to keep his dream alive ahead of a World Cup. Weeks later, Ljuboja made his debut, on 10 September 2005, in a 1–1 draw with Arminia Bielefeld; and a month later, he scored his first goal, on 23 October 2005, in a 1–1 draw with Bayer Leverkusen. Three days before scoring his first Bundesliga goal, Ljuboja scored his first goal in the UEFA Cup in a 2–0 win over Rennes and scored a brace in a 2–0 win over PAOK At Stuttgart, he formed a striking partnership with Jon Dahl Tomasson. Later in the season, he scored eight goals and the club finished in ninth place.

He was contracted in April 2006 (through 2009), but by that his income, that was still paid half by PSG, was lowered significantly. Although he had a valid contract, he demanded from Stuttgart the same wages he got before from PSG. Stuttgart in consequence told him to look for a new club in the summer of 2006 and let him train with their reserve team that played in the third German league.

In August 2006, Ljuboja was transferred on loan to Champions League participant Hamburger SV for one year with the option to buy the player afterwards. Ljuboja made a good start by scoring on his debut, in the first round of DFB-Pokal, in a 4–3 loss against Stuttgarter Kickers; then, made his league debut in a 1–0 loss against Borussia Dortmund on 16 September 2006 and scored his first goal, a week later, in a 2–2 draw against Frankfurt. He also played six games with the team in the UEFA Champions League. At Hamburg, he was also demoted to the reserves team because he did not participate in team briefings. Hamburger SV did not use their option to buy him, so he went back to VfB Stuttgart at the end of the season.

Upon his return, VfB Stuttgart was looking to offload him to another club and he was placed at the Stuttgart reserves. Ljuboja says that he wanted back to France, having desire to leave Stuttgart but to no avail. At the end of July, he was linked a move to Italian side Siena, but the transfer did not materialize. He was also linked with a move to Fulham, having been on trial. He was part of the reserve team of VfB Stuttgart in the Regionalliga.

In January 2008, Ljuboja was loaned out to VfL Wolfsburg, until the end of the season, after training with the club. He made his debut, on 2 February 2008, in a 1–1 draw against Arminia Bielefeld; then one month later, he scored his first goal in a 1–1 draw against Hamburg. At the end of the season, Wolfsburg did not use the option to sign the forward permanently.

In July 2008, he was pardoned and returned to the first team of VfB Stuttgart, but was again downgraded to the reserve team VfB Stuttgart II on 5 February 2009 until the end of his contract in June 2009. In June 2009, Ljuboja left after three years at Stuttgart and became a free agent.

=== Return to France ===
After four years in Germany, Ljuboja returned to France on 23 July 2009 signing with Grenoble Foot 38. He made his league debut in the club's opening match of the season, a 2–0 defeat at home to Marseille on 8 August 2009, coming on for Josip Tadić. In the next game, he scored his first goal, in a 2–1 loss against Boulogne. On 8 May 2010, he scored a brace in a 2–0 win over Boulogne. At the end of the season, Grenoble was relegated to Ligue 2. Despite the relegation, he had a good season, scoring ten goals in thirty-four appearances. In the new season, Ljuboja made three more appearances before leaving for Nice.

On 31 August 2010 (the transfer deadline), he then signed with Ligue 1 Nice, for a fee of €300K. He made his league debut in the club's opening match of the season, in a 2–1 win over Bordeaux. A week later, he scored his first goal in a 2–1 loss against Rennes. He also scored twice in a 3–2 win over Arles-Avignon on 11 May 2011. After a mixed season, he finished with six goals in all competitions and he left the club.

=== Legia Warsaw ===
After one season in Nice, he yet again changed his club by signing with Polish Ekstraklasa club Legia Warsaw on a one-year deal. He made his league debut in the club's opening match of the season, in a 3–1 win over KS Cracovia; then, scored twice in a 3–1 win over Górnik Zabrze. Having scored three goals in four matches, he was awarded the Player of the month. On 29 September 2011, he scored and provided an assist in a 3–2 win over Israeli side Hapoel Tel Aviv in the Europa League group stage. Later in the season, he scored eleven goals, making the club's top-scorer this season. In April 2012, he signed a new one-year contract with the club. In his first season, he won the 2012 Polish Cup.

The next season, Ljuboja started his season when he scored two goals in the Europa League qualifying, in both legs against SV Ried. In the league, his performance got better when he scored a hat-trick on the opening game of the season, in a 4–0 win over Korona Kielce. In late November, his performance could have made him a legend icon at the club. In January, Ljuboja could leave the club at the end of the season. The club would win a double: the league and the cup. In May 2013, Ljuboja, along with Miroslav Radović, was disciplined by the club over drinking alcohol in one of the club's premises. It announced that Ljuboja will leave the club. In July 2013, he returned again to France where he joined RC Lens on a one-year deal. In December 2014, he has retired from active football to become a talent scout for Legia Warsaw.

== International career ==
He was a part of Serbia and Montenegro national team, collected 19 caps and scored one goal. Ljuboja featured for his country in the group stage of the 2006 FIFA World Cup. He scored his first and only goal in a 3–2 win over Wales national football team back in 2003 in a UEFA Euro 2004 qualifying match.

== Career statistics ==
=== International ===
Appearances and goals by national team and year
National team	Year	Apps	Goals
Serbia and Montenegro/Serbia
Serbia and Montenegro/Serbia	2003	4	1
Serbia and Montenegro/Serbia	2004	3	0
Serbia and Montenegro/Serbia	2005	6	0
Serbia and Montenegro/Serbia	2006	6	0
Total		19	1

== Honours ==
RC Strasbourg

- Coupe de France: 2001

Paris Saint-Germain

- Coupe de France: 2004

Legia Warsaw

- Ekstraklasa: 2012–13
- Polish Cup: 2011–12, 2012–13

Individual

- Ekstraklasa Player of the Month: August 2011
- Piłka Nożna Foreigner of the Year: 2012
