= Xavier Chalier =

French footballer (born 1974)

Personal information
- Date of birth: 13 June 1974 (age 52)
- Place of birth: Chartres, France
- Height: 1.77 m (5 ft 10 in)
- Position: Forward

Senior career*
Years	Team	Apps	(Gls)
- Amicale de Lucé
1996–1997	Auxerre B		
1997–1998	Auxerre	1	(0)
1998–2002	Amiens		
2002–2003	Wasquehal	26	(2)
2004–2006	Stade Poitevin		
- * Club domestic league appearances and goals

Xavier Chalier (born 13 June 1974) is a French former footballer who played as a forward.
