= Jacques Rémy (footballer) =

French footballer (born 1972)

Personal information
- Date of birth: 3 March 1972 (age 54)
- Place of birth: Denain, France
- Height: 1.83 m (6 ft 0 in)
- Position: Striker

Team information
- Current team: Liberia Mia
- Number: 9

Senior career*
| Years | Team | Apps | (Gls) |
| 1993–1994 | SM Caen | 3 | (0) |
| 1994–1995 | FC Istres | | |
| 1995–1996 | US Marseille Endoume | | |
| 1996–1997 | FC Martigues | 13 | (1) |
| 1997 | Pau FC | 16 | (14) |
| 1997–2000 | FC Martigues | 60 | (48) |
| 2000–2001 | RC Strasbourg | 13 | (1) |
| 2001–2002 | Grenoble Foot | 29 | (10) |
| 2002–2004 | FC Istres | 67 | (21) |
| 2004–2005 | FC Rouen | 25 | (5) |
| 2005–2007 | SO Cassis Carnoux | | |
| 2007– | Liberia Mia | 34 | (18) |
| | Sporting Toulon Var | 15 | (10) |
- * Club domestic league appearances and goals as of December 3, 2008

Jacques Rémy (born 3 March 1972) is a French soccer striker who is currently retired after he played for Municipal Liberia in Costa Rica.

Whilst at Strasbourg Rémy played as a substitute in the 2001 Coupe de France Final in which they beat Amiens SC on penalties.
