= Emmerick Darbelet =

French footballer (born 1973)

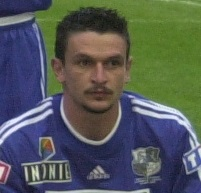

Personal information
- Full name: Fabrice Emmerick Darbelet
- Date of birth: August 4, 1973 (age 53)
- Place of birth: Moulins, France
- Height: 1.72 m (5 ft 8 in)
- Position: Midfielder

Team information
- Current team: Rodez AF (assistant)

Youth career
- RCF Paris

Senior career*
Years	Team	Apps	(Gls)
1990–1992	RCF Paris	23	(1)
1992–1994	Rennes	36	(3)
1994–1999	Le Mans	162	(24)
1999–2001	Amiens	63	(8)
2001–2002	Ajaccio	33	(8)
2002–2005	Chamois Niortais	72	(10)
2005–2006	Clermont Foot	17	(0)
2006	Rouen	8	(0)
2006–2009	Moulins	81	(11)

Managerial career
- 2009–2013: Moulins (assistant)
- 2013–2014: Moulins (reserves)
- 2015–2017: Jura Sud (assistant)
- 2018–2020: Fontenay
- 2020–: Rodez AF (assistant)
- 2022: Rodez AF (caretaker)
- * Club domestic league appearances and goals

Fabrice Emmerick Darbelet (born August 4, 1973) is a French former professional footballer who played as a midfielder.
