= List of French football transfers 2001 =

This is a list of French football transfers for the 2001–02 summer transfer window. Only transfers featuring Division 1 and Division 2 are listed.

== Division 2 ==
Note: Flags indicate national team as has been defined under FIFA eligibility rules. Players may hold more than one non-FIFA nationality.

=== Ajaccio ===
==== In ====
No.	Pos	Player	Transferred from	Fee	Date	Source
–	MF	(Ivory Coast) Michel Bassolé			1 July 2001	
–	MF	(France) Xavier Bécas	(France) Sedan B		1 July 2001	
–	MF	(France) Emmerick Darbelet	(France) Amiens		1 July 2001	
–	FW	(Brazil) José Júnior	(Belgium) Beveren		1 July 2001	
–	GK	(France) Patrice Luzi	(France) Monaco B	Free	1 July 2001	
–	FW	(France) Samba N'Diaye	(France) Niort		1 July 2001	
–	GK	(France) Stéphane Trévisan	(France) Marseille		1 July 2001	
–	DF	(France) David Terrier	(France) Nice		1 August 2001	
–	DF	(France) Nicolas Plestan	(France) Monaco B	Loan	1 July 2001	
–	DF	(Morocco) Walid Regragui	(France) Toulouse	Free	20 November 2001	
–	FW	(France) David Faderne	(France) Caen		1 December 2001	
–	MF	(France) Nicolas Sahnoun	(France) Bordeaux B	Loan	1 January 2002	

==== Out ====
No.	Pos	Player	Transferred to	Fee	Date	Source
–	FW	(Ivory Coast) Servais Konan Kan	(Italy) Alzano Virescit		1 July 2001	
–	GK	(France) Thibault Maqua			1 July 2001	
–	FW	(Algeria) Farid Soudani	(France) AC Ajaccio B		1 July 2001	
–	GK	(Senegal) Tony Sylva	(France) Monaco		1 July 2001	
–	DF	(France) Yohan Toursel			1 July 2001	
–	DF	(France) Philippe Burle	(Spain) Racing Ferrol	Free	1 July 2001	
–	FW	(France) Vincent Petit	(Spain) CD Logroñés	Free	1 July 2001	
–	FW	(France) Steve Savidan	(France) Angers	Free	1 July 2001	
–	FW	(France) Nicolas Plestan	(France) Monaco	Loan return	1 January 2002	

=== Amiens ===
==== In ====
No.	Pos	Player	Transferred from	Fee	Date	Source
–	MF	(Tunisia) Fahid Ben Khalfallah	(France) Péronne		1 July 2001	
–	FW	(Ivory Coast) Hamed Diallo	(France) Laval		1 July 2001	
–	GK	(France) Sébastien Maté	(France) Laval		1 July 2001	
–	DF	(France) Julien Outrebon	(France)		1 July 2001	
–	DF	(France) Jean-Marie Stephanopoli	(France) Laval		1 July 2001	
–	MF	(France) Thierry Moreau	(France) Toulouse FC		18 July 2001	
–	FRA	Michel Rodriguez	(France) Montpellier		1 August 2001	

==== Out ====
No.	Pos	Player	Transferred to	Fee	Date	Source
–	MF	(France) Emmerick Darbelet	(France) Ajaccio		1 July 2001	
–	FW	(France) Stéphane Lecocq	(France) Rouen	Free	1 July 2001	
–	DF	(France) Thomas Mienniel	(France) Tours		1 July 2001	
–	DF	(France) Cédric Fontaine	(France) Créteil		1 July 2001	
–	MF	(France) Guy Mukoko	(France) SC Abbeville		1 July 2001	
–	DF	(Romania) Valentin Necsulescu			1 July 2001	
–	GK	(France) Philippe Poil	N/A	Retired	1 July 2001	
–	FW	(France) Claude-Arnaud Rivenet	(France) La Louvière		1 July 2001	
–	MF	(France) Stéphane Rondelaere	(Spain) Gimnàstic		1 July 2001	

==== Loan in ====
5 July 2001

- Fabrice Abriel from Paris S-G

=== Beauvais ===
==== In ====
No.	Pos	Player	Transferred from	Fee	Date	Source
–	GK	(France) Jérôme Bottelin	(France) Nancy		1 July 2001	
–	DF	(France) Gildas Dambeti			1 July 2001	
–	MF	(France) Sébastien Heitzmann	Louhans-Csx		1 July 2001	
–	FW	(France) Léonardo Lopez	Bordeaux B		1 July 2001	
–	FW	(France) Rémi Maréval	(France) Chantilly	Free	1 July 2001	
–	FW	(France) Cédric Pardeilhan	(France) Niort	Free	1 July 2001	
–	FW	(France) Grégory Thil			1 July 2001	
–	FW	(France) Jérôme Lempereur	(Belgium) Gent		1 October 2001	

==== Out ====
No.	Pos	Player	Transferred to	Fee	Date	Source
–	GK	(France) Nicolas Florentin			1 July 2001	
–	DF	(France) Arnaud Gonzalez			1 July 2001	
–	MF	(France) Komlan Assignon			1 July 2001	
–	FW	(France) Christophe Borbiconi			1 July 2001	

1 July 2001

- Nicolas Florentin to Nancy U-19
- Arnaud Gonzalez to Niort
- Komlan Assignon Retired
- Christophe Borbiconi Retired
- David Castilla Retired
- Cyril Charton Retired
- Stéphane Guiraud Retired
- Riad Hammadou Retired
- Johan Jacquesson Retired
- David Camara Free
- Réginald Ray Free

1 September 2001

- Frédéric Machado Retired

1 October 2001

- Sébastien Heitzmann to Reims

1 December 2001

- Hervé Fischer Free

==== Loans in ====
1 July 2001

- Guillaume Beuzelin from Le Havre Loan
- Egutu Oliseh from Nancy Loan
- Mickaël Rodrigues from Nancy Loan

1 August 2001

- Marc-Eric Gueï from Montpellier Loan

=== Caen ===
==== In ====
No.	Pos	Player	Transferred from	Fee	Date	Source
–	GK	(France) Jean-Marie Aubry	Monaco		1 July 2001	
–	DF	(France) Olivier Bellisi	(France) Louhans-Csx	Return from loan	1 July 2001	
–	DF	(France) Pascal Braud	(France) Niort		1 July 2001	
–	FW	(France) Frédéric Coquerel			1 July 2001	
–	FW	(France) David Faderne	(France) Bastia		1 July 2001	
–	FW	(France) Xavier Gravelaine	Monaco		1 July 2001	
–	FW	(France) Sébastien Mazure	(France) Le Havre		1 July 2001	
–	DF	(France) Cédric Hengbart	(France) Mondeville		1 July 2001	

1 July 2001

- Sébastien Mazure from Le Havre
- Kamel Ouejdide from Red Star Return from loan
- Nicolas Seube from TFC B

31 July 2001

- Bogdan Hriscu from Dinamo Bucarest

12 September 2001

- Franck Dumas from Lens Free

==== Out ====
No.	Pos	Player	Transferred to	Fee	Date	Source
–	GK	(France) Jérôme Hiaumet	(France) Rennes U-19		1 July 2001	
–	DF	(France) Grégory Tafforeau	(France) Hellemmes		1 July 2001	
–	MF	(France) Olivier Bogaczyk			1 July 2001	
–	FW	(France) Nicolas Esceth-N'Zi			1 July 2001	

1 July 2001

- Jérôme Hiaumet to Rennes U-19
- Grégory Tafforeau to Hellemmes
- Olivier Bogaczyk Retired
- Nicolas Esceth-N'Zi Retired
- Miloš Glonek Retired
- Christophe Horlaville Retired
- Richard Lecour Retired
- Stéphane Tanguy Retired
- Frédéric Viseux Retired
- Johan Gallon Free

1 December 2001

- David Faderne to Corte

1 August 2001

- Arthur Gnohéré Retired

=== Châteauroux ===
==== In ====
No.	Pos	Player	Transferred from	Fee	Date	Source
–	GK	(France) Morlaye Cissé	(Guyana) Horoya AC		1 July 2001	
–	DF	(France) Jean-Christophe Colard	(France) Sedan B		1 July 2001	
–	MF	(France) Lilian Compan	(France) Créteil		1 July 2001	
–	FW	(Togo) Thomas Dossevi	(France) Valence	Return from loan	1 July 2001	
–	MF	(Madagascar) Tahina Randriamananantoandro	(France) Lens B		1 July 2001	
–	FW	(France) Steve Savidan	(France) AC Ajaccio	Return from loan	1 July 2001	
–	GK	(France) Christophe Eggimann	(France) RC Strasbourg	Loan	1 July 2001	

==== Out ====
No.	Pos	Player	Transferred to	Fee	Date	Source
–	GK	(France) Cédric Daury	(France) AJ Auxerre		1 July 2001	
–	DF	(France) Laurent Dufresne	(France) Cambrai		1 July 2001	
–	MF	(France) Yohan Charlot		Free	1 July 2001	
–	FW	(France) Steve Savidan		Free	23 July 2001	
–	FW	(France) Grégory Malicki	(France) Niort U-19		30 August 2001	
–	MF	(France) Benjamin Nivet			25 January 2002	

=== Créteil ===
==== In ====
No.	Pos	Player	Transferred from	Fee	Date	Source
–	DF	(France) Claude Dambury	(Japan) Gamba Osaka		1 June 2001	
–	MF	(Togo) Komlan Assignon	(France) Beauvais		1 July 2001	
–	FW	(France) Anthony Bancarel	(France) Ajaccio		1 July 2001	
–	FW	(France) Julien Corti	(France) Evry FC		1 July 2001	
–	DF	(France) Cédric Fontaine	(France) Amiens		1 July 2001	
–	DF	(France) Olivier Frapolli	(France) Martigues		1 July 2001	
–	DF	(France) Kevin Hatchi	(France) Auxerre B		1 July 2001	

1 July 2001

- Mickaël Marquet M. Marquet Nancy B
- Fawzi Moussouni Fawzi Moussouni JS Kabylie
- Mohamed Zouaoui Mohamed Zouaoui Valence
- John Gope-Fenepej Gope-Fenepej Nantes B Loan

13 August 2001

- Mickaël Madar Mickaël Madar Paris S-G

1 December 2001

- Koffi Fiawoo Koffi Fiawoo Lorient

1 February 2002

- Paul-Hervé Essola P.-H. Essola Bastia Loan

==== Out ====
1 July 2001

- Stéphane Cassard S. Cassard Strasbourg
- Hubert Castets Hubert Castets Plouzané
- Lilian Compan Lilian Compan Hyères
- Jean-Luc Dogon Jean-Luc Dogon ASSE U-19
- Rudy Giublesi Rudy Giublesi Illies
- Mirko Jovanovic Mirko Jovanovic Backa Topola
- Xavier Méride Xavier Méride Douai
- Romain Pitau Romain Pitau Montpellier
- Mathieu Assou-Ekotto Assou-Ekotto Retired Free
- Adel Boutobba Adel Boutobba Retired
- Samuel Fenillat Samuel Fenillat Retired
- David Le Frapper D. Le Frapper Retired
- Pascal Philippe Pascal Philippe Retired
- Pierre Planus Pierre Planus Retired
- Arnaud Séguy Arnaud Séguy Retired
- M'Sadek Senoussi M. Senoussi Retired
- Patrice Assouvie P. Assouvie Free
- Philippe Cuervo Philippe Cuervo Free
- René Peters René Peters Free

10 August 2001

- Anthony Bancarel A. Bancarel ACA U-19

1 October 2001

- Mickaël Murcy Mickaël Murcy Chartres

14 December 2001

- Nicolas Huysman Nicolas Huysman UT Pétange Free

1 February 2002

- Franck Histilloles F. Histilloles ASB B

=== Grenoble ===
==== In ====
No.	Pos	Player	Transferred from	Fee	Date	Source
–	MF	(France) Xavier Dablemont	(France) Lorient		1 July 2001	
–	DF	(France) William Louiron	(France) Angers			
–	FW	(Algeria) Ali Meçabih	(France) Martigues			
–	DF	(Senegal) Pape Hamadou N'Diaye	(France) Le Havre B			
–	FW	(Cameroon) Bertrand Tchami	(France) Romorantin			
–	DF	(France) Nicolas Weber	(France) Le Havre B			
–	MF	(Switzerland) Paulo Diogo	(Switzerland) Servette		27 July 2001	
–	FW	(France) Jacques Rémy	(France) Strasbourg	Loan	28 August 2001	

==== Out ====
No.	Pos	Player	Transferred to	Fee	Date	Source
–	GK	(France) David Morele			1 July 2001	
–	DF	Oumar Tchomogo	(France) Niort U-19		1 July 2001	
–	FW	(Portugal) Bambo Bambo	N/A	Retired	1 July 2001	
–	FW	(France) Ali Hadjères	(France) Bourges	Free	1 July 2001	

1 July 2001

- Hugo Miguel Laranjo H. M. Laranjo Retired
- Marcio Menezes Marcio Menezes Retired
- Gabrijel Radojičić G. Radojicic Retired
- Sébastien Riou Sébastien Riou Retired
- Luciano Sergi Luciano Sergi Retired
- Julien Tissot Julien Tissot Retired
- Mounir Traoré Mounir Traoré Retired
- Jean-Pascal Yao Jean-Pascal Yao Retired

=== Gueugnon ===
==== In ====
No.	Pos	Player	Transferred from	Fee	Date	Source
–	GK	(France) Olivier Bochu	(France) Beauvais B		1 July 2001	
–	DF	(France) Florian Boucansaud			1 July 2001	
–	FW	(Algeria) Mansour Boutabout	(Greece) Ionikos		1 July 2001	
–	FW	(France) Jean-Marc Branger	(France) Red Star FC		1 July 2001	
–	FW	(France) Vincent Chanlon			1 July 2001	
–	DF	(France) Christophe Dussart	(France) Clermont		1 July 2001	
–	DF	(France) Christophe Ettori	(France) Cannes		1 July 2001	
–	FW	(France) Olivier Fauconnier	(France) Alès		1 July 2001	

1 July 2001

- Andrés Grande Andrés Grande Ferro
- Guillaume Mulak Guillaume Mulak GSI Pontivy
- Habibou Traoré Habibou Traoré ASECN

2 July 2001

- Nicolas Diez Nicolas Diez Racing Club

10 December 2001

- Pascal Gourville P.-D. Gourville Sedan Loan

==== Out ====
No.	Pos	Player	Transferred to	Fee	Date	Source
–	FW	(France) David Andréani	(France) Draguignan		1 July 2001	
–	DF	(France) Federico Bessone			1 July 2001	
–	DF	(France) Emmanuel Gas	(France) Clermont		1 July 2001	
–	FW	(Togo) Robert Malm	(France) PSG U-19		1 July 2001	

1 July 2001

- Sylvio De Abreu Sylvio De Abreu Retired
- Pepe N'Diaye Sada N'Diaye Retired
- Marcelo Trapasso M. Trapasso Retired
- Fabien Weber Fabien Weber Retired
- Mickaël Wolski Mickaël Wolski Retired
- Jaouad Zaïri Jaouad Zaïri Retired
- Richard Massolin R. Massolin Free Free

1 December 2001

- Yohan Bouzin Yohan Bouzin Retired

=== Istres ===
==== In ====
1 July 2001

- Laurent Castro Laurent Castro Red Star
- Franck Chaussidière Chaussidière Lens B
- Jean-Yves de Blasiis De Blasiis Norwich
- Dragan Đukanović D. Djukanovic Racing CFF
- Malik Hebbar Malik Hebbar Noisy-le-Sec
- Patrice Maurel Patrice Maurel TFC B
- Cédric Mouret Cédric Mouret Marseille
- Filipe Teixeira Filipe Teixeira Felgueiras Free
- Brahim Thiam Brahim Thiam Red Star
- Samba Diawara Samba Diawara Troyes B Loan

29 August 2001

- Cédric Kanté Cédric Kanté Strasbourg B Loan
- Pascal Berenguer P. Berenguer Bastia B Loan

1 January 2002

- Ousmane Sanda Sanda O. Sanda Sanda Anvers

==== Out ====
1 July 2001

- Jérôme Adam Jérôme Adam Saint-Nazaire AF
- Christophe Duboscq C. Duboscq Avranches B
- Aziz Belissaoui Aziz Belissaoui Retired
- Vincent Ehouman Vincent Ehouman Retired
- Marc Maufroy Marc Maufroy Retired
- David Guion David Guion Free

17 December 2001

- Laurent Castro Laurent Castro Retired

24 January 2002

- Ibrahima Bangoura I. Bangoura Retired

=== Laval ===
==== In ====
1 July 2001

- Dramane Coulibaly D. Coulibaly Marseille
- Rémi Gomis Rémi Gomis
- Jérôme Hiaumet J. Hiaumet Caen
- Jérôme Monier Jérôme Monier Troyes
- Miguel Mussard Miguel Mussard Clermont
- Richard Socrier Richard Socrier FBBP 01
- Mounir Soufiani Mounir Soufiani Bourges 18

10 July 2001

- David Le Frapper D. Le Frapper Créteil Free

1 August 2001

- Mickaël Citony Mickaël Citony Rennes Loan

16 August 2001

- Philippe Cuervo Philippe Cuervo Créteil Free

15 November 2001

- Lionel Prat Lionel Prat Free Free

==== Out ====
30 June 2001

- Ludovic Delporte L. Delporte Douai

1 July 2001

- Éric Sitruk Eric Sitruk Saint-Aubin
- Jean-Marie Stéphanopoli to Lorient
- Charles Devineau to Nantes
- Hamed Modibo Diallo Hamed Diallo Retired
- Sébastien Maté S. Maté Retired
- Franck Moulin Franck Moulin Retired
- Laurent Tomczyk Laurent Tomczyk Retired
- Aziz Ben Askar Aziz Ben Askar Free
- Cyril Yapi Cyril Yapi Free

=== Le Havre ===
==== In ====
1 January 2002

- Jamel Aït Ben Idir Aït Ben Idir
- David Martot David Martot Fécamp

==== Out ====
30 June 2001

- Adnan Čustović Adnan Custovic Free agent

1 July 2001

- Yann Soloy Yann Soloy Retired
- Sébastien Mazure S. Mazure FCBO
- Guillaume Beuzelin G. Beuzelin Free

19 September 2001

- Patrick Revelles P. Revelles Unknown

1 November 2001

- Éric Deloumeaux to Motherwell

=== Le Mans ===
==== In ====
1 July 2001

- Didier Lang from Metz
- Yohann Rangdet from Red Star

==== Out ====
31 May 2001

- Olivier Pickeu to Caen

1 July 2001

- Cédric Chabert Retired
- Nicolas Dordevic Retired

27 January 2002

- Didier Drogba to Guingamp

=== Martigues ===
==== In ====
1 July 2001

- Guillaume Boronad G. Boronad Canet Roussillon
- Baptiste Gentili B. Gentili AC Ajaccio
- Vincent Guignery V. Guignery Libourne
- Innocent Hamga Innocent Hamga Espanyol B
- Fabrice Kelban Fabrice Kelban Charleroi
- Mickaël Tacalfred M. Tacalfred Red Star Free
- Ronald Thomas Ronald Thomas Guingamp
- Patrick Videira Patrick Videira Ermesinde
- Kenny Vigier Kenny Vigier Paris S-G B
- Stéphane Borbiconi S. Borbiconi Metz B Loan

5 August 2001

- Gaël Hiroux from Paris Saint-Germain B

23 August 2001

- Sylvain Deplace from Guingamp Free

31 August 2001

- Anto Drobnjak from Sochaux

1 August 2001

- Selim Benachour from Paris Saint-Germain loan

23 August 2001

- Hervé Bugnet from Bordeaux B Loan

1 December 2001

- Tagro Baléguhé from Marseille B
- Sébastien Sansoni from Marseille B

1 January 2002

- David Klein from Partick Thistle

==== Out ====
29 June 2001

- Olivier Frapolli O. Frapolli Laval

30 June 2001

- Gaël Hiroux Gaël Hiroux Retired

1 July 2001

- Azzouz Kara Azzouz Kara Unknown
- Richard Martini Richard Martini La Cadière-d'Azur
- Abassi Boinaheri A. Boinahéri Retired
- Domenico Bruno Domenico Bruno Retired
- Olivier Calabuig O. Calabuig Retired
- Jean-Jacques Davezac J.-J. Davezac Retired
- Samuel Lobé Samuel Lobé Retired
- Karim Malagouen Karim Malagouen Retired
- Philippe Mazzuchetti P. Mazzuchetti Retired
- Ali Meçabih to Grenoble

23 December 2001

- Patrice Eyraud Free

1 January 2002

- Alexandre Coulot to Avignon
- Daniel Koffi-Konan to AC Port-de-Bouc
- Gaël Hiroux to Paris Saint-Germain loan return

=== Nancy ===
==== In ====
1 July 2001

- Cédric Bockhorni C. Bockhorni
- David Camara David Camara Beauvais
- Pape Diakhaté Pape Diakhaté
- Laurent Dufresne L. Dufresne Châteauroux
- Nicolas Florentin N. Florentin Beauvais Return from loan
- Philippe Schuth Philippe Schuth Gueugnon Free
- Sadio Sow Sadio Sow Niort
- François Zoko François Zoko
- Mathieu Béda Mathieu Beda Bordeaux B Loan

25 August 2001

- Cyril Ramond Cyril Ramond Montpellier Loan

==== Out ====
1 July 2001

- Frédéric Biancalani F. Biancalani Guingamp W
- Johann Chapuis Johann Chapuis Bresse Jura
- Abdeslam Ouaddou A. Ouaddou Loto
- Nicolas Rabuel Nicolas Rabuel VA
- Mickaël Rodrigues M. Rodrigues Chambray
- Jérôme Bottelin to Beauvais (loan)
- Egutu Oliseh to Beauvais (loan)
- Loris Reina Loris Reina Retired
- Pablo Correa Pablo Correa Free

31 December 2001

- Ze Alcino Ze Alcino Retired

4 February 2002

- Sadio Sow Sadio Sow Free

=== Nice ===
==== In ====
1 July 2001

- Abdallah Bah from D.C. United
- Kelly Berville from Valence Return from loan
- Juan Carlos Carcedo from Atlético Madrid Return from loan
- Abdelmalek Cherrad from Cannes Return from loan
- Jean-Charles Cirilli from USF Le Puy
- Christophe Meslin from Gazélec
- Romain Pitau from Créteil
- Janick Tamazout Janick Tamazout Free

==== Out ====
30 June 2001

- Alcaly Camara Retired

1 July 2001

- Éric Cubilier Retired
- José de la Sagra to Dénia
- Andrea Ghidini Retired
- Lionel Prat Retired
- Giancarlo Filippini Free
- Attilio Nicodemo Free
- Jero Shakpoke Free
- Gustavo Vasallo Free

1 August 2001

- Alphonse Tchami Retired

1 January 2002

- Juan Carlos Carcedo Free to Leganés

=== Nîmes ===
==== In ====
1 July 2001

- Yohann Alemany Yohann Alemany
- Kévin Barralon Kevin Barralon Lyon B
- Christophe Borbiconi C. Borbiconi Beauvais
- Sébastien Bresson S. Bresson Beaucaire
- Romain Canalès Romain Canalès
- Renaud Cohade Renaud Cohade Lyon B
- Oifeck El-Moujahid O. El-Moujahid
- Ali Nechad Ali Nechad Mende
- Mourad Ourahou Mourad Ourahou
- Frédéric Pierre F. Pierre Anderlecht
- Réginald Ray Réginald Ray Beauvais

1 January 2002

- Slađan Đukić from Troyes Free

31 January 2002

- Ufuk Talay from Galatasaray

==== Out ====
1 July 2001

- Régis Brouard Régis Brouard Bastia
- Julien Leccese Julien Leccese Unknown
- Frédéric Piquionne F. Piquionne Martinique
- Julien Rantier Julien Rantier Codogno
- Christophe Grau Christophe Grau Retired
- Julien Vellas Julien Vellas Retired

1 January 2002

- Sébastien Fidani S. Fidani Retired
- Arthur Moses Arthur Moses Retired

=== Niort ===
==== In ====
1 July 2001

- Nacim Abdelali Nacim Abdelali
- Tanguy Barro Tanguy Barro RC Bobo
- Mathieu Blais Mathieu Blais
- Jocelyn Ducloux Jocelyn Ducloux Louhans-Csx
- Jérôme Foulon Jérôme Foulon Guingamp B
- Benoît Maurice Benoît Maurice Clermont
- Samuel Michel Samuel Michel Guingamp

28 January 2002

- Sebastián Cobelli S. Cobelli Genoa

==== Out ====
1 July 2001

- Cédric Pardeilhan C. Pardeilhan Anglet
- Miguel D'Agostino M. D'Agostino Retired
- Samba N'Diaye Samba N'Diaye Retired
- Franck Navarro Franck Navarro Retired
- Mickaël Tronche M. Tronche Retired
- Pascal Braud Pascal Braud Free
- Jean-Luc Escayol J.-L. Escayol Free
- Sadio Sow Sadio Sow Free

=== Saint-Étienne ===
==== In ====
1 July 2001

- Pathé Bangoura Pathé Bangoura
- Olivier Baudry Olivier Baudry Lausanne
- Giovanni Bia Giovanni Bia Bologna
- Patrice Carteron P. Carteron Sunderland Return from loan
- Dominique Casagrande D. Casagrande Paris S-G
- Damien Deom Damien Deom Red Star
- David Hellebuyck D. Hellebuyck Lausanne
- Frédéric Mendy F. Mendy
- Aleksandr Panov Aleksandr Panov Lausanne Return from loan
- Rodrigão Alflen Rodrigão Alflen Santos

9 August 2001

- Marcin Kuźba Marcin Kuzba Lausanne

16 August 2001

- Patrick Guillou Patrick Guillou Sochaux

1 September 2001

- Antonio Esposito A. Esposito Cagliari
- 1 November 2001
- Ted Agasson Ted Agasson Free
- Cyrille Pouget Cyrille Pouget Marseille B Loan

1 January 2002

- Eduardo Oliveira E. Oliveira Sedan

==== Out ====
1 June 2001

- Aloísio to PSG
- Lionel Potillon Lionel Potillon Free

1 July 2001

- Fabien Boudarène F. Boudarène Lure
- Stéphane Pédron S. Pédron Lorient
- Jérôme Alonzo Jérôme Alonzo Retired
- Loïc Chavériat L. Chavériat Retired
- Tchiressoua Guel T. Guel Retired
- Bjørn Tore Kvarme B. T. Kvarme Retired
- Christophe Sanchez C. Sanchez Retired
- Pape Sarr Pape Sarr Retired
- Jean-Guy Wallemme J.-G. Wallemme Retired

1 August 2001

- Alex Dias Alex Dias Retired

28 September 2001

- Lucien Mettomo Lucien Mettomo Retired

28 December 2001

- Aleksandr Panov Aleksandr Panov Retired

=== Strasbourg ===
==== In ====
1 July 2001

- Christian Bassila C. Bassila West Ham
- Gonzalo Belloso G. L. Belloso Cruz Azul Return from loan
- Guillaume Lacour G. Lacour Lyon B
- Cédric Stoll Cédric Stoll

25 July 2001

- Mixu Paatelainen M. Paatelainen Hibernian

10 September 2001

- Pierre Laurent from Bastia

1 December 2001

- Stéphane Collet from Real Sociedad
- Pape Thiaw from Lausanne Loan

==== Out ====
30 June 2001

- Pierre Njanka Pierre Njanka Retired

1 July 2001

- Gharib Amzine Gharib Amzine Troyes B
- Valérien Ismaël V. Ismaël WBA 2.3 M€
- Christophe Eggimann C. Eggimann Retired
- Nuno Mendes to União Leiria (loan)

28 August 2001

- Jacques Rémy to Grenoble

31 August 2001

- Péguy Luyindula P. Luyindula Free

1 January 2002

- Gonzalo Belloso G. L. Belloso Retired

=== Wasquehal ===
==== In ====
No.	Pos	Player	Transferred from	Fee	Date	Source
–	GK	(France) Julien Gibert	(France) Lunel		1 July 2001	
–	DF	(France) Gilles Leclerc	(France) Sochaux	Free	1 July 2001	
–	MF	(Togo) Robert Malm	(France) Gueugnon		1 July 2001	
–	FW	(France) Fethi Mohad	(France) Lunel		1 July 2001	
–	FW	(France) Foued Soltani	(France) R.Besançon		1 July 2001	
–	FW	(Angola) Titi Buengo	(France) Saint-Quentin	Free	1 July 2001	
–	FW	(France) Geoffrey Dernis	(France) Lille B	Loan	1 July 2001	
–	FW	(Morocco) Yazid Kaïssi	(France) Lens B	Loan	1 July 2001	
–	DF	(Romania) Ion Florin Calugarita	(Romania) CSM Resita		26 July 2001	
–	MF	(Argentina) Patricio D'Amico	(France) Metz	Loan	1 August 2001	
–	FW	(France) Sébastien Fidani	(France) Nîmes		1 January 2002	

==== Out ====
No.	Pos	Player	Transferred to	Fee	Date	Source
–	FW	(Martinique) Éric Sabin	(England) Swindon Town	Free	1 July 2001	
–	FW	(France) Arnaud Demars	(France) Armentières		1 July 2001	
–	FW	(Cape Verde) Adilson Furtado	(France) Armentières		1 July 2001	
–	MF	Hervé Hagard	(France) RC Paris	Free	1 July 2001	
–	FW	(France) Kaci Abbas	(France) Paris Saint-Germain B	Loan return	1 July 2001	
–	MF	(France) Faycal Bendaoud	(France) Péronne		1 July 2001	

- Stéphane Dufour S. Dufour Retired
- Aziz El Khanchaf A. El-Khanchaf Retired
- Nicolas Mayeux Nicolas Mayeux Retired
- Sheriff N'Gom Sheriff N'Gom Retired
- Cyril Revillet Cyril Revillet Retired
