= 2001–02 FC Martigues season =

FC Martigues
2001–02 season
- French Division 2: 20th (relegated)
- Coupe de France: Round of 64
- Coupe de la Ligue: Round of 32

The 2001–02 season was the 81st season in the existence of FC Martigues and the club's third consecutive season in the second division of French football. In addition to the domestic league, FC Martigues competed in this season's edition of the Coupe de France and Coupe de la Ligue. The season covered the period from 1 July 2001 to 30 June 2002.

== Players ==
=== First-team squad ===
Note: Flags indicate national team as defined under FIFA eligibility rules; some limited exceptions apply. Players may hold more than one non-FIFA nationality.

No.	Pos.	Nation	Player
—	GK	FRA	David Klein
—	GK	FRA	Ronald Thomas
—	GK	POL	Stanislaw Karwat
—	GK	FRA	Alexandre Coulot
—	GK	FRA	Sébastien Lombard
—	DF	FRA	Stéphane Borbiconi
—	DF	FRA	Cyril Serredszum
—	DF	MLI	Eric Chelle
—	DF	FRA	Sébastien Sansoni
—	DF	FRA	Fabrice Kelban
—	DF	GLP	Mickaël Tacalfred
—	DF	FRA	Fabien Artès
—	DF	FRA	Sylvain Adolphe
—	DF	CMR	Innocent Hamga
—	DF	FRA	Rod Fanni
—	DF	FRA	Vincent Guignery
—	MF	FRA	Sylvain Deplace
—	MF	FRA	Patrice Eyraud

No.	Pos.	Nation	Player
—	MF	FRA	Patrick Videira
—	MF	TUN	Selim Benachour
—	MF	FRA	Philippe Mazzuchetti
—	MF	FRA	Barket Bekrar
—	MF	ALG	Mohamed Ait-Atmane
—	MF	FRA	Frédéric Firly
—	MF	FRA	Gaël Laget
—	MF	ALG	Ahmed Aït Ouarab
—	MF	FRA	Guillaume Boronad
—	MF	FRA	Kenny Vigier
—	FW	YUG	Anto Drobnjak
—	FW	FRA	Hervé Bugnet
—	FW	FRA	Christophe Ajas
—	FW	FRA	Gaël Hiroux
—	FW	CIV	Tagro Baléguhé
—	FW	CIV	Daniel Koffi-Konan
—	FW	CIV	Ali Aïdara

=== Overall record ===
Competition	First match	Last match	Starting round	Final position	Record							
Competition	First match	Last match	Starting round	Final position	Pld	W	D	L	GF	GA	GD	Win %
Division 2	28 July 2001	3 May 2002	Matchday 1	20th	38	7	11	20	32	53	−21	18.42
Coupe de France	3 November 2001	14 December 2001	Seventh round	Round of 64	3	1	1	1	5	3	+2	33.33
Coupe de la Ligue	1 September 2001	2 December 2001	First round	Round of 32	2	1	0	1	4	2	+2	50.00
Total					43	9	12	22	41	58	−17	20.93

Source: Competitions

=== French Division 2 ===
==== League table ====
Pos	Team	Pld	W	D	L	GF	GA	GD	Pts	Promotion or Relegation
16	Grenoble	38	10	12	16	38	55	−17	42	
17	Istres	38	8	17	13	34	43	−9	41	
18	Créteil	38	9	14	15	35	46	−11	41	
19	Nîmes (R)	38	5	17	16	33	48	−15	32	Relegation to Championnat National [fr]
20	Martigues (R)	38	7	11	20	32	53	−21	32	Relegation to Championnat National [fr]

Source: Ligue 2
(R) Relegated

==== Results summary ====
Overall								Home						Away					
Pld	W	D	L	GF	GA	GD	Pts	W	D	L	GF	GA	GD	W	D	L	GF	GA	GD
38	7	11	20	32	53	−21	32	5	8	6	20	21	−1	2	3	14	12	32	−20

Source: Ligue 2

==== Results by round ====
Round	1	2	3	4	5	6	7	8	9	10	11	12	13	14	15	16	17	18	19	20	21	22	23	24	25	26	27	28	29	30	31	32	33	34	35	36	37	38
Ground	H	A	H	A	H	A	H	A	H	A	H	A	H	A	A	H	A	H	A	H	A	H	A	H	A	H	A	H	A	H	A	H	H	A	H	A	H	A
Result	D	D	L	L	D	L	W	L	L	W	L	L	W	L	L	D	D	D	L	W	L	W	D	D	L	L	L	W	L	D	W	D	L	L	D	L	L	L
Position	9	14	19	20	18	20	16	17	19	15	16	20	16	20	20	19	19	20	20	18	18	17	18	18	19	19	20	19	19	19	19	19	19	19	19	19	19	20

Source: Ligue 2
A = Away; H = Home; W = Win; D = Draw; L = Loss
