= 2001–02 AS Nancy Lorraine season =

Nancy
2001–02 season
- Owner: Jacques Rousselot
- President: Jacques Rousselot
- Head coach: Francis Smerecki
- Stadium: Stade Marcel Picot
- French Division 2: 9th
- Coupe de France: Round of 16
- Coupe de la Ligue: Quarter-finals
- Top goalscorer: League: Frédéric Fouret (8); All: Frédéric Fouret (10)

The 2001–02 season was the 92nd season in the existence of AS Nancy Lorraine and the club's third consecutive season in the second division of French football. In addition to the domestic league, AS Nancy Lorraine competed in this season's edition of the Coupe de France and Coupe de la Ligue. The season covered the period from 1 July 2001 to 30 June 2002.

== Players ==
=== First-team squad ===
Note: Flags indicate national team as defined under FIFA eligibility rules; some limited exceptions apply. Players may hold more than one non-FIFA nationality.

No.	Pos.	Nation	Player
—	GK	(France) FRA	Bertrand Laquait
—	GK	(France) FRA	Olivier Sorin
—	GK	(France) FRA	Philippe Schuth
—	DF	(France) FRA	Paul Fischer
—	DF	(France) FRA	Vincent Hognon
—	DF	(France) FRA	Cédric Lecluse
—	DF	(Mali) MLI	Pape Diakhaté
—	DF	(France) FRA	Mathieu Beda
—	DF	(Senegal) SEN	Elhadj Seydou Camara
—	DF	(Algeria) ALG	Karim Djellal
—	DF	(Morocco) MAR	Monsef Zerka
—	DF	(France) FRA	Cédric Bockhorni
—	DF	(Cameroon) CMR	Romarin Billong
—	DF	(Senegal) SEN	Sadio Sow
—	DF	(France) FRA	Cyril Ramond
—	MF	(France) FRA	Laurent Moracchini

No.	Pos.	Nation	Player
—	MF	(France) FRA	Sébastien Chabaud
—	MF	(France) FRA	Benjamin Nicaise
—	MF	(France) FRA	David Camara
—	MF	(France) FRA	Olivier Rambo
—	MF	(France) FRA	Gaston Curbelo
—	MF	(France) FRA	Jonathan Assous
—	MF	(France) FRA	Youssef Moustaïd
—	MF	(Morocco) MAR	Mehdi Taouil
—	MF	(France) FRA	Nicolas Florentin
—	MF	(France) FRA	Antony Rigole
—	FW	(Morocco) MAR	Youssouf Hadji
—	FW	(France) FRA	Frédéric Fouret
—	FW	(France) FRA	Laurent Dufresne
—	FW	(Brazil) BRA	Ze Alcino
—	FW	(France) FRA	Samba Sow
—	FW	(Ivory Coast) CIV	François Zoko

== Competitions ==
Win Draw Loss

=== Overall record ===
Competition	First match	Last match	Starting round	Final position	Record							
Competition	First match	Last match	Starting round	Final position	Pld	W	D	L	GF	GA	GD	Win %
Division 2	28 July 2001	3 May 2002	Matchday 1	9th	38	12	15	11	0	0	+0	31.58
Coupe de France	November 2001	TBD	Seventh round	Round of 16	5	4	0	1	7	3	+4	80.00
Coupe de la Ligue	1 December 2001	27 January 2002	First round	Quarter-finals	3	2	1	0	6	3	+3	66.67
Total					46	18	16	12	13	6	+7	39.13

Source: Competitions

=== French Division 2 ===
==== League table ====
Pos	Team	Pld	W	D	L	GF	GA	GD	Pts
7	Beauvais	38	13	18	7	37	25	+12	57
8	Châteauroux	38	15	8	15	41	42	−1	53
9	Nancy	38	12	15	11	42	38	+4	51
10	Laval	38	14	8	16	50	56	−6	50
11	Niort	38	11	15	12	40	39	+1	48

Source: Ligue 2

==== Results summary ====
Overall								Home						Away					
Pld	W	D	L	GF	GA	GD	Pts	W	D	L	GF	GA	GD	W	D	L	GF	GA	GD
38	12	15	11	42	38	+4	51	7	8	4	21	18	+3	5	7	7	21	20	+1

Source: Ligue 2

==== Results by round ====
Round	1	2	3	4	5	6	7	8	9	10	11	12	13	14	15	16	17	18	19	20	21	22	23	24	25	26	27	28	29	30	31	32	33	34	35	36	37	38
Ground	A	H	A	H	A	H	A	H	A	H	A	H	H	A	H	A	H	A	H	A	H	A	H	A	H	A	H	A	H	A	A	H	A	H	A	H	A	H
Result	L	D	D	L	D	W	L	W	D	W	D	D	W	L	W	W	L	W	L	D	D	L	D	L	D	L	W	D	D	W	D	D	W	D	L	L	W	W
Position	19	19	18	18	17	15	17	12	12	10	12	11	10	10	9	7	8	5	8	9	9	9	11	12	14	15	14	13	14	10	11	11	9	10	10	10	10	9

Source: Ligue 2
A = Away; H = Home; W = Win; D = Draw; L = Loss

==== Matches ====
28 July 2001 1	Ajaccio	4–2	Nancy	Ajaccio
20:00 CEST (UTC+2)	Colling 45'; Squillaci 52'; Abou 55'; Granon 90'	Report	Fouret 42'; Chabaud 59'	Stadium: Stadio Arechi; Attendance: 2,114; Referee: Patrick Lhermite

4 August 2001 2	Nancy	1–1	Amiens	Tomblaine
20:00 CEST (UTC+2)	Dufresne 18'	Report	Durpes 13'	Stadium: Stadio Arechi; Referee: Bruno Derrien

== Statistics ==
=== Squad statistics ===
No.	Pos	Nat	Player	Total		Division 2		Coupe de France		Coupe de la Ligue			
No.	Pos	Nat	Player	Apps	Goals	Apps	Goals	Apps	Goals	Apps	Goals		
Goalkeepers
1	GK	(France) FRA	[[]]	0	0	0	0	0	0	0	0	0	0
1	GK	(France) FRA	[[]]	0	0	0	0	0	0	0	0	0	0
Defenders
1	DF	(France) FRA	[[]]	0	0	0	0	0	0	0	0	0	0
1	DF	(France) FRA	[[]]	0	0	0	0	0	0	0	0	0	0
Midfielders
1	MF	(France) FRA	[[]]	0	0	0	0	0	0	0	0	0	0
1	MF	(France) FRA	[[]]	0	0	0	0	0	0	0	0	0	0
Forwards
1	FW	(France) FRA	[[]]	0	0	0	0	0	0	0	0	0	0
1	FW	(France) FRA	[[]]	0	0	0	0	0	0	0	0	0	0
Players who have made an appearance or had a squad number this season but have left the club
1	GK	(France) FRA	[[]]	0	0	0	0	0	0	0	0	0	0

=== Goalscorers ===
Rank	No.	Pos	Nat	Name	Division 2	Coupe de France	Coupe de la Ligue	Total	
1	1	FW	(France)	[[]]	0	0	0	0	
2	2	MF	(France)	[[]]	0	0	0	0	
2	Totals					0	0	0	0
