= 2001–02 Stade Malherbe Caen season =

Stade Malherbe Caen
2001–02 season
- President: Guy Chambily
- Head coach: Hervé Gauthier
- Stadium: Stade Michel d'Ornano
- French Division 2: 6th
- Coupe de France: Round of 64
- Coupe de la Ligue: Round of 32
Home colours	Away colours

The 2001–02 season was the 89th season in the history of Stade Malherbe Caen and the club's third consecutive season in the second division of French football. In addition to the domestic league, Stade Malherbe Caen competed in this season's edition of the Coupe de France and Coupe de la Ligue. The season covered the period from 1 July 2001 to 30 June 2002.

== Players ==
=== First-team squad ===
Note: Flags indicate national team as defined under FIFA eligibility rules; some limited exceptions apply. Players may hold more than one non-FIFA nationality.

No.	Pos.	Nation	Player
—	GK	FRA	Fabrice Catherine
—	GK	FRA	Jean-Marie Aubry
—	DF	FRA	Franck Dumas
—	DF	FRA	Jimmy Hébert
—	DF	FRA	Jean-Philippe Caillet
—	DF	FRA	Pascal Braud
—	DF	FRA	Gaël Suares
—	DF	ROU	Bogdan Hriscu
—	DF	FRA	Cédric Hengbart
—	DF	FRA	Olivier Bellisi
—	MF	FRA	Nicolas Seube
—	MF	FRA	Mathieu Bodmer
—	MF	ALG	Salah Bakour

No.	Pos.	Nation	Player
—	MF	MTQ	Bruno Grougi
—	MF	FRA	Marc Zanotti
—	MF	FRA	Christophe Le Grix
—	MF	FRA	David Garcion
—	MF	FRA	Anthony Deroin
—	FW	FRA	Xavier Gravelaine
—	FW	FRA	Sébastien Mazure
—	FW	FRA	David Faderne
—	FW	FRA	Frédéric Coquerel
—	FW	FRA	Cyrille Watier
—	FW	MAR	Kamel Ouejdide
—	FW	FRA	Clément Gouiran

== Pre-season and friendlies ==
Win Draw Loss Fixtures

1 September 2001 Friendly	Caen (France)	0–2	(France) Paris Saint-Germain	Caen, France
			Alex Dias, 19′; Nicolas Anelka, 61′.	Stadium: Stade Michel d'Ornano; Attendance: 7,591

== Competitions ==
=== Overall record ===
Competition	First match	Last match	Starting round	Final position	Record							
Competition	First match	Last match	Starting round	Final position	Pld	W	D	L	GF	GA	GD	Win %
Division 2	28 July 2001	3 May 2002	Matchday 1	6th	38	16	10	12	59	55	+4	42.11
Coupe de France	November 2001	TBD	Seventh round	Round of 64	3	2	0	1	7	3	+4	66.67
Coupe de la Ligue	1 December 2001		Round of 32	Round of 32	1	0	0	1	0	2	−2	0.00
Total					42	18	10	14	66	60	+6	42.86

Source: Competitions

=== French Division 2 ===
==== League table ====
Pos	Team	Pld	W	D	L	GF	GA	GD	Pts	Promotion or Relegation
4	Le Havre (P)	38	17	14	7	56	32	+24	65	Promotion to Ligue 1
5	Le Mans	38	16	10	12	48	41	+7	58	
6	Caen	38	16	10	12	59	55	+4	58	
7	Beauvais	38	13	18	7	37	25	+12	57	
8	Châteauroux	38	15	8	15	41	42	−1	53	

Source: Ligue 2
(P) Promoted

==== Results summary ====
Overall								Home						Away					
Pld	W	D	L	GF	GA	GD	Pts	W	D	L	GF	GA	GD	W	D	L	GF	GA	GD
38	16	10	12	59	55	+4	58	11	5	3	30	21	+9	5	5	9	29	34	−5

Source: Ligue 2

==== Results by round ====
Round	1	2	3	4	5	6	7	8	9	10	11	12	13	14	15	16	17	18	19	20	21	22	23	24	25	26	27	28	29	30	31	32	33	34	35	36	37	38
Ground	A	H	A	H	A	H	A	H	A	H	A	H	A	H	A	H	H	A	H	A	H	A	H	A	H	A	H	A	H	A	H	A	H	A	A	H	A	H
Result	L	W	D	W	D	L	W	W	W	D	L	W	D	W	D	D	L	L	W	L	D	L	D	L	L	L	D	L	W	L	W	D	W	W	W	W	W	W
Position	13	7	8	6	7	10	7	6	3	3	5	3	5	3	5	4	5	6	5	6	6	6	7	8	10	12	13	14	11	12	12	13	11	9	9	7	7	6

Source: Ligue 2
A = Away; H = Home; W = Win; D = Draw; L = Loss

==== Matches ====
28 July 2001 1	Grenoble	4–3	Caen	Grenoble
20:00 CEST (UTC+2)	Weber 11', 52'; Dogbé 68', 70'	Report	Faderne 37', 40'; Gravelaine 51'	Stadium: Stadio Arechi; Referee: Gaël Lecellier

4 August 2001 2	Caen	1–0	Wasquehal	Caen
20:00 CEST (UTC+2)	Gravelaine 85'	Report		Stadium: Stade Michel d'Ornano; Attendance: 9,998; Referee: Pascal Garibian

11 August 2001 3	Ajaccio	1–1	Caen	Ajaccio
--:-- CEST (UTC+2)				Stadium: Stade François Coty

18 August 2001 4	Caen	1–0	Martigues	Caen
--:-- CEST (UTC+2)				Stadium: Stade Michel d'Ornano

25 August 2001 5	Gueugnon	2–2	Caen	Gueugnon
--:-- CEST (UTC+2)				Stadium: Stade Jean Laville

29 August 2001 6	Caen	2–4	Amiens	Caen
--:-- CEST (UTC+2)				Stadium: Stade Michel d'Ornano

8 September 2001 7	Laval	0–1	Caen	Laval
--:-- CEST (UTC+2)				Stadium: Stade Francis Le Basser

14 September 2001 8	Caen	1–0	Nice	Caen
--:-- CEST (UTC+2)				Stadium: Stade Michel d'Ornano

21 September 2001 9	Istres	0–3	Caen	Istres
--:-- CEST (UTC+2)				Stadium: Stade Bernard Bardin

29 September 2001 10	Caen	0–0	Le Havre	Caen
--:-- CEST (UTC+2)				Stadium: Stade Michel d'Ornano

5 October 2001 11	Strasbourg	3–1	Caen	Strasbourg
--:-- CEST (UTC+2)				Stadium: Stade de la Meinau

13 October 2001 12	Caen	2–1	Niort	Caen
--:-- CEST (UTC+2)				Stadium: Stade Michel d'Ornano

20 October 2001 13	Nîmes	2–2	Caen	Nîmes
--:-- CEST (UTC+2)				Stadium: Stade des Costières

28 October 2001 14	Caen	1–0	Nancy	Caen
--:-- CEST (UTC+2)				Stadium: Stade Michel d'Ornano

8 November 2001 15	Beauvais	1–1	Caen	Beauvais
--:-- CEST (UTC+2)				Stadium: Stade Pierre Brisson

13 November 2001 16	Caen	1–1	Châteauroux	Caen
--:-- CEST (UTC+2)				Stadium: Stade Michel d'Ornano

17 November 2001 17	Caen	2–4	Saint-Étienne	Caen
--:-- CEST (UTC+2)				Stadium: Stade Michel d'Ornano

28 November 2001 18	Créteil	4–2	Caen	Créteil
--:-- CEST (UTC+2)				Stadium: Stade Dominique Duvauchelle

8 December 2001 19	Caen	2–0	Le Mans	Caen
--:-- CEST (UTC+2)				Stadium: Stade Michel d'Ornano

19 December 2001 20	Wasquehal	2–0	Caen	Villeneuve-d'Ascq
--:-- CEST (UTC+2)				Stadium: Stadium Lille Métropole

22 December 2001 21	Caen	1–1	Ajaccio	Caen
--:-- CEST (UTC+2)				Stadium: Stade Michel d'Ornano

5 January 2002 22	Martigues	2–1	Caen	Martigues
--:-- CEST (UTC+2)				Stadium: Stade Francis Turcan

12 January 2002 23	Caen	2–2	Gueugnon	Caen
--:-- CEST (UTC+2)				Stadium: Stade Michel d'Ornano

23 January 2002 24	Amiens	3–2	Caen	Amiens
--:-- CEST (UTC+2)				Stadium: Stade de la Licorne

30 January 2002 25	Caen	1–2	Laval	Caen
--:-- CEST (UTC+2)				Stadium: Stade Michel d'Ornano

3 February 2002 26	Nice	2–1	Caen	Nice
--:-- CEST (UTC+2)				Stadium: Stade du Ray

6 February 2002 27	Caen	1–1	Istres	Caen
--:-- CEST (UTC+2)				Stadium: Stade Michel d'Ornano

12 February 2002 28	Le Havre	2–1	Caen	Le Havre
--:-- CEST (UTC+2)				Stadium: Stade Jules Deschaseaux

16 February 2002 29	Caen	2–1	Strasbourg	Caen
--:-- CEST (UTC+2)				Stadium: Stade Michel d'Ornano

23 February 2002 30	Niort	2–0	Caen	Niort
--:-- CEST (UTC+2)				Stadium: Stade René Gaillard

6 March 2002 31	Caen	1–0	Nîmes	Caen
--:-- CEST (UTC+2)				Stadium: Stade Michel d'Ornano

16 March 2002 32	Nancy	3–3	Caen	Tomblaine
--:-- CEST (UTC+2)				Stadium: Stade Marcel Picot

22 March 2002 33	Caen	3–2	Beauvais	Caen
--:-- CEST (UTC+2)				Stadium: Stade Michel d'Ornano

26 March 2002 34	Châteauroux	0–2	Caen	Châteauroux
--:-- CEST (UTC+2)				Stadium: Stade Gaston-Petit

6 April 2002 35	Saint-Étienne	0–1	Caen	Saint-Étienne
--:-- CEST (UTC+2)				Stadium: Stade Geoffroy-Guichard

13 April 2002 36	Caen	3–0	Créteil	Caen
--:-- CEST (UTC+2)				Stadium: Stade Michel d'Ornano

26 April 2002 37	Le Mans	1–2	Caen	Le Mans
--:-- CEST (UTC+2)				Stadium: Stade Léon-Bollée

3 May 2002 38	Caen	3–2	Grenoble	Caen
--:-- CEST (UTC+2)				Stadium: Stade Michel d'Ornano

=== Coupe de la Ligue ===
1 December 2001 Round of 32	Strasbourg	2–0	Caen	Strasbourg
--:-- CET (UTC+1)				Stadium: Stade de la Meinau

== Statistics ==
=== Squad statistics ===
No.	Pos	Nat	Player	Total		Division 2		Coupe de France		Coupe de la Ligue			
No.	Pos	Nat	Player	Apps	Goals	Apps	Goals	Apps	Goals	Apps	Goals		
Goalkeepers
1	GK	(France) FRA	[[]]	0	0	0	0	0	0	0	0	0	0
1	GK	(France) FRA	[[]]	0	0	0	0	0	0	0	0	0	0
Defenders
1	DF	(France) FRA	[[]]	0	0	0	0	0	0	0	0	0	0
1	DF	(France) FRA	[[]]	0	0	0	0	0	0	0	0	0	0
Midfielders
1	MF	(France) FRA	[[]]	0	0	0	0	0	0	0	0	0	0
1	MF	(France) FRA	[[]]	0	0	0	0	0	0	0	0	0	0
Forwards
1	FW	(France) FRA	[[]]	0	0	0	0	0	0	0	0	0	0
1	FW	(France) FRA	[[]]	0	0	0	0	0	0	0	0	0	0
Players who have made an appearance or had a squad number this season but have left the club
1	GK	(France) FRA	[[]]	0	0	0	0	0	0	0	0	0	0

=== Goalscorers ===
Rank	No.	Pos	Nat	Name	Division 2	Coupe de France	Coupe de la Ligue	Total
1	1	FW	(France)	[[]]	0	0	0	0
2	2	MF	(France)	[[]]	0	0	0	0
Totals					0	0	0	0
