= 2000–01 Angers SCO season =

Angers SCO
2000–01 season
- President: Pierre Abraham
- Head coach: Denis Goavec (until 20 January); Stéphane Mottin (from 28 January)
- Stadium: Stade Raymond Kopa
- French Division 2: 20th (relegated)
- Coupe de France: Round of 32
- Coupe de la Ligue: First round
- Top goalscorer: League: Yoann Tapella (5); All: Yoann Tapella (5)
- Average home league attendance: 3,661

The 2000–01 season was the 82nd season in the history of Angers SCO and their eighth consecutive season in the top flight. The club participated in Division 2, the Coupe de France, and the Coupe de la Ligue. The season covered the period from 1 July 2000 to 30 June 2001.

Angers finished in the bottom to return immediately to the Championnat National after a one-year absence.

== Competitions ==
=== Overall record ===
Competition	First match	Last match	Starting round	Final position	Record							
Competition	First match	Last match	Starting round	Final position	Pld	W	D	L	GF	GA	GD	Win %
Division 2	29 July 2000	18 May 2001	Matchday 1	20th	38	7	12	19	35	60	−25	18.42
Coupe de France	November 2000	February 2001	Seventh round	Round of 32	4	3	1	0	5	1	+4	75.00
Coupe de la Ligue	1 November 2000		First round	First round	1	0	0	1	2	4	−2	0.00
Total					43	10	13	20	42	65	−23	23.26

Source: Competitions

=== Division 2 ===
==== League table ====
Pos	Team	Pld	W	D	L	GF	GA	GD	Pts	Promotion or Relegation
16	Créteil	38	10	13	15	37	43	−6	43	
17	Caen	38	11	10	17	38	53	−15	43	
18	Martigues	38	8	15	15	30	46	−16	39	
19	Cannes (R)	38	8	10	20	45	66	−21	34	Relegation to Championnat National [fr]
20	Angers (R)	38	7	12	19	35	60	−25	33	Relegation to Championnat National [fr]

Source: Ligue 2
(R) Relegated

==== Results summary ====
Overall								Home						Away					
Pld	W	D	L	GF	GA	GD	Pts	W	D	L	GF	GA	GD	W	D	L	GF	GA	GD
38	7	12	19	35	60	−25	33	7	7	5	22	17	+5	0	5	14	13	43	−30

Source: Division 2

==== Results by round ====
Round	1	2	3	4	5	6	7	8	9	10	11	12	13	14	15	16	17	18	19	20	21	22	23	24	25	26	27	28	29	30	31	32	33	34	35	36	37	38
Ground	A	H	A	H	A	A	H	A	H	A	H	A	H	A	H	A	H	A	H	A	H	A	H	H	A	H	A	H	A	H	A	H	A	H	A	H	A	H
Result	L	D	D	L	L	L	D	D	W	L	W	D	L	L	D	L	D	L	L	L	D	L	W	L	L	D	L	W	L	L	L	W	D	D	D	W	L	W
Position	15	13	12	16	18	20	19	19	19	20	17	18	19	19	19	19	20	20	20	20	20	20	20	20	20	20	20	20	20	20	20	20	20	20	20	20	20	20

Source: Division 2
A = Away; H = Home; W = Win; D = Draw; L = Loss

==== Matches ====
29 July 2000 1	Niort	3–2	Angers	Niort
CEST (UTC+2)

5 August 2000 2	Angers	1–1	Ajaccio	Angers
CEST (UTC+2)				Stadium: Stade Jean-Bouin

13 August 2000 3	Martigues	1–1	Angers	Martigues
CEST (UTC+2)

19 August 2000 4	Angers	1–3	Le Mans	Angers
CEST (UTC+2)				Stadium: Stade Jean-Bouin

26 August 2000 5	Châteauroux	3–2	Angers	Châteauroux
CEST (UTC+2)

29 August 2000 6	Cannes	3–0	Angers	Cannes
CEST (UTC+2)

1 September 2000 7	Angers	0–0	Le Havre	Angers
CEST (UTC+2)				Stadium: Stade Jean-Bouin

6 September 2000 8	Montpellier	1–1	Angers	Montpellier
CEST (UTC+2)

9 September 2000 9	Angers	2–0	Sochaux	Angers
CEST (UTC+2)				Stadium: Stade Jean-Bouin

16 September 2000 10	Lorient	3–0	Angers	Lorient
CEST (UTC+2)

23 September 2000 11	Angers	2–0	Wasquehal	Angers
CEST (UTC+2)				Stadium: Stade Jean-Bouin

30 September 2000 12	Nancy	0–0	Angers	Tomblaine
CEST (UTC+2)				Stadium: Stade Marcel Picot

7 October 2000 13	Angers	1–2	Gueugnon	Angers
CEST (UTC+2)				Stadium: Stade Jean-Bouin

11 October 2000 14	Laval	4–1	Angers	Laval
CEST (UTC+2)				Stadium: Stade Francis Le Basser

14 October 2000 15	Angers	1–1	Créteil	Angers
CEST (UTC+2)				Stadium: Stade Jean-Bouin

21 October 2000 16	Nice	2–0	Angers	Nice
CEST (UTC+2)				Stadium: Stade du Ray

28 October 2000 17	Angers	1–1	Beauvais	Angers
CEST (UTC+2)				Stadium: Stade Jean-Bouin

4 November 2000 18	Nîmes	3–0	Angers	Nîmes
CEST (UTC+2)				Stadium: Stade des Costières

11 November 2000 19	Angers	0–1	Caen	Angers
CEST (UTC+2)				Stadium: Stade Jean-Bouin

18 November 2000 20	Ajaccio	3–1	Angers	Ajaccio
CEST (UTC+2)				Stadium: Stade François Coty

29 November 2000 21	Angers	1–1	Martigues	Angers
CEST (UTC+2)				Stadium: Stade Jean-Bouin

2 December 2000 22	Le Mans	2–1	Angers	Le Mans
CEST (UTC+2)

9 December 2000 23	Angers	2–1	Châteauroux	Angers
CEST (UTC+2)				Stadium: Stade Jean-Bouin

21 December 2000 24	Angers	1–3	Cannes	Angers
CEST (UTC+2)				Stadium: Stade Jean-Bouin

13 January 2001 25	Le Havre	2–1	Angers	Le Havre
CEST (UTC+2)

28 January 2001 26	Angers	0–0	Montpellier	Angers
CEST (UTC+2)				Stadium: Stade Jean-Bouin

3 February 2001 27	Sochaux	2–0	Angers	Montbéliard
CEST (UTC+2)

7 February 2001 28	Angers	2–1	Lorient	Angers
CEST (UTC+2)				Stadium: Stade Jean-Bouin

17 February 2001 29	Wasquehal	3–1	Angers	Wasquehal
CEST (UTC+2)

3 March 2001 30	Angers	1–2	Nancy	Angers
CEST (UTC+2)	Molinier 25'		Bottelin 8'; Rambo 90'	Stadium: Stade Jean-Bouin

17 March 2001 31	Gueugnon	2–0	Angers	Gueugnon
CEST (UTC+2)	Traoré 44'; Aubanel 48'			Stadium: Stade Jean Laville

23 March 2001 32	Angers	1–0	Laval	Angers
CEST (UTC+2)	Tapella 37'			Stadium: Stade Jean-Bouin

27 March 2001 33	Créteil	1–1	Angers	Créteil
CEST (UTC+2)	Jovanović 2'		Tapella 60' (pen.)

7 April 2001 34	Angers	0–0	Nice	Angers
CEST (UTC+2)				Stadium: Stade Jean-Bouin

20 April 2001 35	Beauvais	1–1	Angers	Beauvais
CEST (UTC+2)	Ray 11'		Grossmann 36'	Stadium: Stade Pierre Brisson

28 April 2001 36	Angers	3–0	Nîmes	Angers
CEST (UTC+2)	Molinier 63' (pen.); Voisin 89'; Citron 90'			Stadium: Stade Jean-Bouin

11 May 2001 37	Caen	4–0	Angers	Caen
CEST (UTC+2)	Garcion 38' (pen.); Bogaczyk 65'; Watier 75', 86'			Stadium: Stade Michel d'Ornano

18 May 2001 38	Angers	2–0	Niort	Angers
CEST (UTC+2)	Tapella 7'; Molinier 60'	Report		Stadium: Stade Jean-Bouin; Referee: Serge Fidri

=== Coupe de France ===
November 2000 Seventh round	La mélorienne de Football	0–1	Angers
CET (UTC+1)

December 2000 Eighth round	CEP Lorient	1–3	Angers
CET (UTC+1)

January 2001 Round of 64	Laval	0–1	Angers	Laval
CET (UTC+1)				Stadium: Stade Francis Le Basser

January 2001 Round of 32	Angers	0–0 (a.e.t.) (8–9 p)	Reims	Angers
CET (UTC+1)				Stadium: Stade Jean-Bouin

=== Coupe de la Ligue ===
1 November 2000 First round	Nîmes	4–2	Angers	Nîmes
CET (UTC+1)				Stadium: Stade des Costières
