= 2001–02 LB Châteauroux season =

LB Châteauroux
2001–02 season
- Head coach: Thierry Froger
- French Division 2: 8th
- Coupe de France: Round of 16
- Coupe de la Ligue: Round of 16

The 2001–02 season was the 86th season in the existence of LB Châteauroux and the club's third consecutive season in the second division of French football. In addition to the domestic league, LB Châteauroux competed in this season's edition of the Coupe de France and Coupe de la Ligue. The season covered the period from 1 July 2001 to 30 June 2002.

== Players ==
=== First-team squad ===
Note: Flags indicate national team as defined under FIFA eligibility rules; some limited exceptions apply. Players may hold more than one non-FIFA nationality.

| No. | Pos. | Nation | Player |
|---|---|---|---|
| — | GK | FRA | Grégory Malicki |
| — | GK | FRA | Christophe Eggimann |
| — | GK | FRA | Jean-Christophe Colard |
| — | GK | FRA | Rodolphe Roche |
| — | DF | MAD | Johann Paul |
| — | DF | CIV | Alain Behi |
| — | DF | FRA | Vincent Di Bartolomeo |
| — | DF | FRA | Julien Cordonnier |
| — | DF | FRA | Ludovic Jeannel |
| — | DF | FRA | Laurent Morestin |
| — | DF | GUI | Morlaye Cissé |
| — | DF | FRA | Julien Sassier |
| — | DF | FRA | Alexandre Dujeux |
| — | DF | FRA | Marc Giraudon |
| — | DF | MTQ | Ludovic Clément |

| No. | Pos. | Nation | Player |
|---|---|---|---|
| — | DF | FRA | Vincent Bernardet |
| — | MF | FRA | Stéphane Laquait |
| — | MF | MLI | David Coulibaly |
| — | MF | FRA | Armindo Ferreira |
| — | MF | TOG | Thomas Dossevi |
| — | MF | MAD | Tahina Randriamananantoandro |
| — | MF | FRA | Nicolas Donné |
| — | MF | FRA | Mickaël Villatte |
| — | MF | FRA | Fabien Cerqueira |
| — | MF | FRA | Benjamin Nivet |
| — | MF | FRA | Sébastien Roudet |
| — | FW | FRA | Lilian Compan |
| — | FW | HUN | Zoltan Kovacs |
| — | FW | FRA | Mathieu Maton |

== Transfers ==
=== In ===
| No. | Pos | Player | Transferred from | Fee | Date | Source |
|---|---|---|---|---|---|---|
| – | GK | (France) Morlaye Cissé | (Guyana) Horoya AC | | 1 July 2001 | |
| – | DF | (France) Jean-Christophe Colard | (France) Sedan B | | 1 July 2001 | |
| – | MF | (France) Lilian Compan | (France) Créteil | | 1 July 2001 | |
| – | FW | (Togo) Thomas Dossevi | (France) Valence | Return from loan | 1 July 2001 | |
| – | MF | (Madagascar) Tahina Randriamananantoandro | (France) Lens B | | 1 July 2001 | |
| – | FW | (France) Steve Savidan | (France) AC Ajaccio | Return from loan | 1 July 2001 | |
| – | GK | (France) Christophe Eggimann | (France) RC Strasbourg | Loan | 1 July 2001 | |

=== Out ===
| No. | Pos | Player | Transferred to | Fee | Date | Source |
|---|---|---|---|---|---|---|
| – | GK | (France) Cédric Daury | (France) AJ Auxerre | | 1 July 2001 | |
| – | DF | (France) Laurent Dufresne | (France) Cambrai | | 1 July 2001 | |
| – | MF | (France) Yohan Charlot | | Free | 1 July 2001 | |
| – | FW | (France) Steve Savidan | | Free | 23 July 2001 | |
| – | FW | (France) Grégory Malicki | (France) Niort U-19 | | 30 August 2001 | |
| – | MF | (France) Benjamin Nivet | | | 25 January 2002 | |

== Competitions ==
Win Draw Loss

=== Overall record ===
| Competition | First match | Last match | Starting round | Final position | Record | | | | | | | |
| Competition | First match | Last match | Starting round | Final position | Pld | W | D | L | GF | GA | GD | Win % |
|---|---|---|---|---|---|---|---|---|---|---|---|---|
| Division 2 | 28 July 2001 | 3 May 2002 | Matchday 1 | 8th | 38 | 15 | 8 | 15 | 41 | 42 | −1 | 39.47 |
| Coupe de France | November 2001 | TBD | Seventh round | Round of 16 | 5 | 4 | 0 | 1 | 7 | 2 | +5 | 80.00 |
| Coupe de la Ligue | 1 December 2001 | January 2002 | Round of 32 | Round of 16 | 2 | 1 | 0 | 1 | 4 | 4 | +0 | 50.00 |
| Total | | | | | 45 | 20 | 8 | 17 | 52 | 48 | +4 | 44.44 |

Source: Competitions

=== French Division 2 ===
==== League table ====
| Pos | Team | Pld | W | D | L | GF | GA | GD | Pts |
|---|---|---|---|---|---|---|---|---|---|
| 6 | Caen | 38 | 16 | 10 | 12 | 59 | 55 | +4 | 58 |
| 7 | Beauvais | 38 | 13 | 18 | 7 | 37 | 25 | +12 | 57 |
| 8 | Châteauroux | 38 | 15 | 8 | 15 | 41 | 42 | −1 | 53 |
| 9 | Nancy | 38 | 12 | 15 | 11 | 42 | 38 | +4 | 51 |
| 10 | Laval | 38 | 14 | 8 | 16 | 50 | 56 | −6 | 50 |

Source: Ligue 2

==== Results summary ====
| Overall | | | | | | | | Home | | | | | | Away | | | | | |
| Pld | W | D | L | GF | GA | GD | Pts | W | D | L | GF | GA | GD | W | D | L | GF | GA | GD |
|---|---|---|---|---|---|---|---|---|---|---|---|---|---|---|---|---|---|---|---|
| 38 | 15 | 8 | 15 | 41 | 42 | −1 | 53 | 8 | 5 | 6 | 24 | 20 | +4 | 7 | 3 | 9 | 17 | 22 | −5 |

Source: Ligue 2

==== Results by round ====
| Round | 1 | 2 | 3 | 4 | 5 | 6 | 7 | 8 | 9 | 10 | 11 | 12 | 13 | 14 | 15 | 16 | 17 | 18 | 19 | 20 | 21 | 22 | 23 | 24 | 25 | 26 | 27 | 28 | 29 | 30 | 31 | 32 | 33 | 34 | 35 | 36 | 37 | 38 |
|---|---|---|---|---|---|---|---|---|---|---|---|---|---|---|---|---|---|---|---|---|---|---|---|---|---|---|---|---|---|---|---|---|---|---|---|---|---|---|
| Ground | A | H | A | H | A | H | A | H | A | H | A | H | A | H | H | A | H | A | H | A | H | A | H | A | H | A | H | A | H | A | H | A | A | H | A | H | A | H |
| Result | W | L | L | W | L | W | W | D | L | L | W | D | L | D | W | D | D | L | W | W | W | W | L | L | W | L | L | L | W | W | D | D | D | L | W | L | L | W |
| Position | 2 | 8 | 13 | 8 | 11 | 8 | 6 | 7 | 8 | 11 | 9 | 9 | 11 | 11 | 10 | 10 | 11 | 12 | 10 | 7 | 8 | 8 | 9 | 10 | 6 | 7 | 9 | 10 | 7 | 7 | 7 | 7 | 7 | 7 | 7 | 8 | 8 | 8 |

Source: Ligue 2
A = Away; H = Home; W = Win; D = Draw; L = Loss

==== Matches ====
| 28 July 2001 1 | Wasquehal | 0–2 | Châteauroux | Villeneuve-d'Ascq |
| --:-- CEST (UTC+2) | | | | Stadium: Stadium Lille Métropole |

| 4 August 2001 2 | Châteauroux | 0–2 | Ajaccio | Châteauroux |
| --:-- CEST (UTC+2) | | | | Stadium: Stade Gaston-Petit |

| 11 August 2001 3 | Gueugnon | 2–0 | Châteauroux | Gueugnon |
| --:-- CEST (UTC+2) | | | | Stadium: Stade Jean Laville |

| 18 August 2001 4 | Châteauroux | 2–0 | Amiens | Châteauroux |
| --:-- CEST (UTC+2) | | | | Stadium: Stade Gaston-Petit |

| 24 August 2001 5 | Strasbourg | 2–0 | Châteauroux | Strasbourg |
| --:-- CEST (UTC+2) | | | | Stadium: Stade de la Meinau |

| 29 August 2001 6 | Châteauroux | 4–2 | Le Havre | Châteauroux |
| --:-- CEST (UTC+2) | | | | Stadium: Stade Gaston-Petit |

| 8 September 2001 7 | Nice | 1–2 | Châteauroux | Nice |
| --:-- CEST (UTC+2) | | | | Stadium: Stade du Ray |

| 15 September 2001 8 | Châteauroux | 1–1 | Istres | Châteauroux |
| --:-- CEST (UTC+2) | | | | Stadium: Stade Gaston-Petit |

| 22 September 2001 9 | Laval | 2–1 | Châteauroux | Laval |
| --:-- CEST (UTC+2) | | | | Stadium: Stade Francis Le Basser |

| 29 September 2001 10 | Châteauroux | 2–3 | Martigues | Châteauroux |
| --:-- CEST (UTC+2) | | | | Stadium: Stade Gaston-Petit |

| 5 October 2001 11 | Niort | 1–2 | Châteauroux | Niort |
| --:-- CEST (UTC+2) | | | | Stadium: Stade René Gaillard |

| 13 October 2001 12 | Châteauroux | 0–0 | Nîmes | Châteauroux |
| --:-- CEST (UTC+2) | | | | Stadium: Stade Gaston-Petit |

| 20 October 2001 13 | Nancy | 2–0 | Châteauroux | Tomblaine |
| --:-- CEST (UTC+2) | | | | Stadium: Stade Marcel Picot |

| 27 October 2001 14 | Châteauroux | 0–0 | Beauvais | Châteauroux |
| --:-- CEST (UTC+2) | | | | Stadium: Stade Gaston-Petit |

| 9 November 2001 15 | Châteauroux | 1–0 | Créteil | Châteauroux |
| --:-- CEST (UTC+2) | | | | Stadium: Stade Gaston-Petit |

| 13 November 2001 16 | Caen | 1–1 | Châteauroux | Caen |
| --:-- CEST (UTC+2) | | | | Stadium: Stade Michel d'Ornano |

| 17 November 2001 17 | Châteauroux | 0–0 | Grenoble | Châteauroux |
| --:-- CEST (UTC+2) | | | | Stadium: Stade Gaston-Petit |

| 28 November 2001 18 | Le Mans | 1–0 | Châteauroux | Le Mans |
| --:-- CEST (UTC+2) | | | | Stadium: Stade Léon-Bollée |

| 8 December 2001 19 | Châteauroux | 4–0 | Saint-Étienne | Châteauroux |
| --:-- CEST (UTC+2) | | | | Stadium: Stade Gaston-Petit |

| 19 December 2001 20 | Ajaccio | 0–1 | Châteauroux | Ajaccio |
| --:-- CEST (UTC+2) | | | | Stadium: Stade François Coty |

| 13 January 2002 23 | Châteauroux | 1–2 | Strasbourg | Châteauroux |
| --:-- CEST (UTC+2) | | | | Stadium: Stade Gaston-Petit |

| 23 January 2002 24 | Le Havre | 3–1 | Châteauroux | Le Havre |
| --:-- CEST (UTC+2) | | | | Stadium: Stade Jules Deschaseaux |

| 26 January 2002 21 | Châteauroux | 1–0 | Gueugnon | Châteauroux |
| --:-- CEST (UTC+2) | | | | Stadium: Stade Gaston-Petit |

| 30 January 2002 25 | Châteauroux | 1–0 | Nice | Châteauroux |
| --:-- CEST (UTC+2) | | | | Stadium: Stade Gaston-Petit |

| 2 February 2002 26 | Istres | 2–0 | Châteauroux | Istres |
| --:-- CEST (UTC+2) | | | | Stadium: Stade Bernard Bardin |

| 6 February 2002 27 | Châteauroux | 1–2 | Laval | Châteauroux |
| --:-- CEST (UTC+2) | | | | Stadium: Stade Gaston-Petit |

| 12 February 2002 28 | Martigues | 1–0 | Châteauroux | Martigues |
| --:-- CEST (UTC+2) | | | | Stadium: Stade Francis Turcan |

| 16 February 2002 29 | Châteauroux | 2–1 | Niort | Châteauroux |
| --:-- CEST (UTC+2) | | | | Stadium: Stade Gaston-Petit |

| 23 February 2002 30 | Nîmes | 0–1 | Châteauroux | Nîmes |
| --:-- CEST (UTC+2) | | | | Stadium: Stade des Costières |

| 2 March 2002 22 | Amiens | 0–1 | Châteauroux | Amiens |
| --:-- CEST (UTC+2) | | | | Stadium: Stade de la Licorne |

| 6 March 2002 31 | Châteauroux | 1–1 | Nancy | Châteauroux |
| --:-- CEST (UTC+2) | | | | Stadium: Stade Gaston-Petit |

| 16 March 2002 32 | Beauvais | 1–1 | Châteauroux | Beauvais |
| --:-- CEST (UTC+2) | | | | Stadium: Stade Pierre Brisson |

| 23 March 2002 33 | Créteil | 2–2 | Châteauroux | Créteil |
| --:-- CEST (UTC+2) | | | | Stadium: Stade Dominique Duvauchelle |

| 26 March 2002 34 | Châteauroux | 0–2 | Caen | Châteauroux |
| --:-- CEST (UTC+2) | | | | Stadium: Stade Gaston-Petit |

| 6 April 2002 35 | Grenoble | 0–2 | Châteauroux | Grenoble |
| --:-- CEST (UTC+2) | | | | Stadium: Stade Lesdiguières |

| 13 April 2002 36 | Châteauroux | 0–2 | Le Mans | Châteauroux |
| --:-- CEST (UTC+2) | | | | Stadium: Stade Gaston-Petit |

| 26 April 2002 37 | Saint-Étienne | 1–0 | Châteauroux | Saint-Étienne |
| --:-- CEST (UTC+2) | | | | Stadium: Stade Geoffroy-Guichard |

| 3 May 2002 38 | Châteauroux | 3–2 | Wasquehal | Châteauroux |
| --:-- CEST (UTC+2) | | | | Stadium: Stade Gaston-Petit |

== Statistics ==
=== Squad statistics ===
| No. | Pos | Nat | Player | Total | | Division 2 | | Coupe de France | | Coupe de la Ligue | | | |
| No. | Pos | Nat | Player | Apps | Goals | Apps | Goals | Apps | Goals | Apps | Goals | | |
Goalkeepers
| 1 | GK | (France) FRA | [[]] | 0 | 0 | 0 | 0 | 0 | 0 | 0 | 0 | 0 | 0 |
| 1 | GK | (France) FRA | [[]] | 0 | 0 | 0 | 0 | 0 | 0 | 0 | 0 | 0 | 0 |
Defenders
| 1 | DF | (France) FRA | [[]] | 0 | 0 | 0 | 0 | 0 | 0 | 0 | 0 | 0 | 0 |
| 1 | DF | (France) FRA | [[]] | 0 | 0 | 0 | 0 | 0 | 0 | 0 | 0 | 0 | 0 |
Midfielders
| 1 | MF | (France) FRA | [[]] | 0 | 0 | 0 | 0 | 0 | 0 | 0 | 0 | 0 | 0 |
| 1 | MF | (France) FRA | [[]] | 0 | 0 | 0 | 0 | 0 | 0 | 0 | 0 | 0 | 0 |
Forwards
| 1 | FW | (France) FRA | [[]] | 0 | 0 | 0 | 0 | 0 | 0 | 0 | 0 | 0 | 0 |
| 1 | FW | (France) FRA | [[]] | 0 | 0 | 0 | 0 | 0 | 0 | 0 | 0 | 0 | 0 |
Players who have made an appearance or had a squad number this season but have left the club
| 1 | GK | (France) FRA | [[]] | 0 | 0 | 0 | 0 | 0 | 0 | 0 | 0 | 0 | 0 |

=== Goalscorers ===
| Rank | No. | Pos | Nat | Name | Division 2 | Coupe de France | Coupe de la Ligue | Total | |
|---|---|---|---|---|---|---|---|---|---|
| 1 | 1 | FW | (France) | [[]] | 0 | 0 | 0 | 0 | |
| 2 | 2 | MF | (France) | [[]] | 0 | 0 | 0 | 0 | |
| 2 | Totals | | | | | 0 | 0 | 0 | 0 |
