= Borbiconi =

Borbiconi is a surname. Notable people with the surname include:

- Christophe Borbiconi (born 1973), French footballer and manager
- Marino Borbiconi, Sammarinese politician
- Stéphane Borbiconi (born 1979), French footballer
