= Pierre Chavot =

French author, historian and teacher

- Born: 16 August 1956 (age 69) Paris, France
- Occupation: Author, historian, educator

Pierre Chavot (16 August 1956, Paris) is a French author, historian and teacher.

== Works ==
- 1994: Jésus, l’histoire vraie, by Jean Potin, cowriting, Bayard Presse
- 1998: La mémoire efficace, Les Belles Lettres, ISBN 9782251790220
- 1999: Incas, collection « Les Grandes Aventures », cowriter, editions Mila, ISBN 9782840061915
- 2000: La Bible rendue à l’Histoire, by Jean Potin, cowriter, Bayard, ISBN 9782227350175
- 2000: ABCdaire de la Bible, Flammarion, ISBN 9782080126955
- 2000: ABCdaire de Jésus, Flammarion, ISBN 9782080126818
- 2000: ABCdaire du Christianisme, Flammarion
- 2000: ABCdaire de Prévert, Flammarion
- 2000: Jésus, homme ou Fils de Dieu, Hachette, series "Phare" ISBN 9782846160049
- 2001: Artisans des monastères, Aubanel, ISBN 9782700602548
- 2001: ABCdaire de la Première Guerre mondiale, Flammarion
- 2001: ABCdaire de la Seconde Guerre mondiale, Flammarion
- 2001: ABCdaire de Rimbaud, Flammarion
- 2001: ABCdaire du Surréalisme, Flammarion
- 2001: Les carnets de Geneviève Lethu, En famille et Au bord de l’eau, Flammarion
- 2001: Les petits livres des saints (François, Vincent, Marie, Benoît, Anne, Claire)
- 2001: Moïse, series "Sur les traces de… ", Gallimard Jeunesse
- 2002: Les piments du désir, histoire et secret des aphrodisiaques, Aubanel
- 2002: La cuisine des fromages, texts, Flammarion
- 2002: Les églises de Paris, Arthaud
- 2003: Le dictionnaire de Dieu, La Martinière
- 2005: ABCdaire des papes, Flammarion
- 2005: Le guide de la vie monastique, Éditions Perrin
- 2005: Le champignon des dieux, l’amanite tue-mouches, Dervy
- 2006: Ces Femmes qui ont fait la France, series "Mes p’tits Marabout", Marabout, ISBN 9782501049122
- 2006: Les Héros mythologiques, series "Mes p’tits Marabout", Marabout
- 2006: Les rois de France, series "Mes p’tits Marabout", Marabout
- 2006: Bordeaux l’héritière, with Jean-Pierre Xiradakis, Féret, ISBN 9782351560068
- 2007: Les religions, Hachette pratique, ISBN 9782012373358
- 2008: Les Sirènes et le Peuple des eaux, Le Chasse-Marée/Glénat
- 2008: Authentiquement Sud-Ouest, les meilleures recettes de la Tupiña, with Jean-Pierre Xiradakis, Milano
- 2008: Dictionnaire des dieux, des saints et des hommes, Éditions de l'Archipel, ISBN 9782809801132
- 2009: Monstres marins, Glénat/Chasse-marée
- 2009: Écoliers du monde, Glénat
- 2009: Les phares de Méditerranée, Glénat/Chasse-marée
- 2009: ABC des religions, Marabout
- 2009: L'École, le monde de l'enfance, France Loisirs
- 2010: L'Aquitaine miraculeuse, Pimientos
- 2011: Mémoire et sagesses de nos campagnes, Glénat
- 2011: Les Mystères de Gironde, De Borée
- 2011: À la Table des anges et des démons, with Sophie Brissaud, La Martinière
- 2007: Les religions : l'histoire, traditions et rituels, Hachette
- 2012: Le Monde des femmes, Gourcuff Gradenigo/Plume
- 2012: L'Homme moderne, guide de survie pour l'homme d'aujourd'hui
- 2013: Le Bestiaire des dieux, Dervy
- 2013: Voyages spirituels aux sommets du monde, L'Archipel,
- 2013: Dubern, une maison bordelaise depuis 1894, Éditions Confluences
- 2014: Les Mystères des Landes, De Borée
- 2015: Le Dictionnaire de la foi, Frontispice, Casablanca
- 2016: Réussir avec ou sans le bac. Petit traité de perspectives à l'usage des jeunes (et des moins jeunes !), La Martinière
- 2017: Aux origines de la langue arabe, Éditions du Patrimoine/Frontispice, Casablanca.
- 2019: On n’est pas seul sur la Terre, de Nicolas Lacambre, co-rédaction, Flammarion
- 2022: L'Oreiller de la belle Aurore, roman, Éditions Guy Trédaniel
- 2023: Le Dictionnaire de Dieu - 620 mots pour connaître et comprendre le judaïsme, le christianisme et l'islam, Dervy
