= 2000–01 French Division 2 =

62nd season of the second-tier football league in France

Division 2
- Season: 2000–01

The Division 2 season 2000/2001, organised by the LNF was won by FC Sochaux-Montbéliard and saw the promotions of FC Sochaux-Montbéliard, FC Lorient and Montpellier HSC, whereas AS Cannes and Angers SCO were relegated to National.

== 20 participating teams ==
- Ajaccio
- Angers
- Beauvais
- Caen
- Cannes
- Châteauroux
- Créteil
- Gueugnon
- Laval
- Le Havre
- Le Mans
- Lorient
- Martigues
- Montpellier
- Nancy
- Nice
- Nîmes
- Niort
- Sochaux
- Wasquehal

== League table ==
Pos	Team	Pld	W	D	L	GF	GA	GD	Pts	Promotion or Relegation
1	Sochaux (C, P)	38	21	12	5	67	27	+40	75	Promotion to French Division 1
2	Lorient (P)	38	21	11	6	58	34	+24	74	Promotion to French Division 1
3	Montpellier (P)	38	18	14	6	52	26	+26	68	Promotion to French Division 1
4	Niort	38	15	14	9	58	44	+14	59	
5	Nancy	38	15	11	12	46	32	+14	56	
6	Châteauroux	38	14	14	10	50	38	+12	56	
7	Le Havre	38	14	14	10	48	42	+6	56	
8	Nîmes	38	14	11	13	53	56	−3	53	
9	Laval	38	15	8	15	39	43	−4	53	
10	Gueugnon	38	13	11	14	44	50	−6	50	
11	Beauvais	38	11	14	13	38	42	−4	47	
12	Ajaccio	38	12	10	16	32	40	−8	46	
13	Wasquehal	38	11	12	15	37	40	−3	45	
14	Le Mans	38	9	18	11	37	45	−8	45	
15	Nice	38	13	6	19	39	56	−17	45	
16	Créteil	38	10	13	15	37	43	−6	43	
17	Caen	38	11	10	17	38	53	−15	43	
18	Martigues	38	8	15	15	30	46	−16	39	
19	Cannes (R)	38	8	10	20	45	66	−21	34	Relegation to Championnat National [fr]
20	Angers (R)	38	7	12	19	35	60	−25	33	Relegation to Championnat National [fr]

Source: Ligue 2
(C) Champions; (P) Promoted; (R) Relegated

== Recap ==
- Promoted to L1 : FC Sochaux-Montbéliard, FC Lorient, Montpellier HSC
- Relegated to L2 : RC Strasbourg, AS Saint-Étienne
- Promoted to L2 : Grenoble Foot 38, Amiens SC, FC Istres
- Relegated to National : AS Cannes, Angers SCO (FC Martigues were not relegated since Toulouse FC were relegated from Division 1 to National)

== Results ==
Home \ Away	ACA	ANG	BEA	CAE	CAN	CHA	CRE	GUE	LAV	LHA	MFC	LOR	MAR	MHS	NAL	NIC	NMS	NRT	SOC	WAS
Ajaccio		3–1	2–0	1–0	3–3	0–2	0–0	2–0	1–2	3–0	1–0	0–0	1–0	0–2	1–0	2–1	1–0	0–1	0–0	2–0
Angers	1–1		1–1	0–1	1–3	2–1	1–1	1–2	1–0	0–0	1–3	2–1	1–1	0–0	1–2	0–0	3–0	2–0	2–0	2–0
Beauvais	0–0	1–1		0–1	3–1	2–1	1–1	0–0	0–0	1–1	1–1	1–3	3–1	1–3	1–1	2–0	1–0	1–4	1–2	0–0
Caen	2–0	4–0	1–1		2–2	1–1	1–0	2–1	0–1	1–0	0–2	1–2	1–2	0–0	0–3	1–0	2–2	1–2	1–3	1–2
Cannes	1–0	3–0	0–1	2–0		2–2	4–2	0–1	0–1	1–1	0–0	1–2	0–0	1–2	0–2	2–1	1–1	6–4	2–2	0–0
Châteauroux	2–2	3–2	3–0	0–1	2–0		0–1	1–1	0–0	3–1	0–0	2–0	1–1	0–0	0–0	7–2	1–1	1–0	1–1	2–0
Créteil	1–0	1–1	1–1	0–1	3–1	1–2		1–2	4–0	2–0	1–0	2–1	0–0	1–1	1–0	0–1	1–2	1–1	1–0	2–0
Gueugnon	0–0	2–0	2–0	1–1	2–1	0–1	2–0		2–0	1–2	0–0	1–1	0–1	2–4	1–1	1–2	3–3	1–0	1–1	2–1
Laval	0–0	4–1	0–2	2–1	2–1	0–2	3–2	2–1		1–0	2–1	1–2	2–0	0–0	0–0	2–0	3–1	0–1	0–0	1–0
Le Havre	4–0	2–1	1–0	2–1	2–2	0–0	1–1	1–3	3–1		3–0	1–1	0–0	3–0	1–0	1–0	2–0	2–2	2–3	1–1
Le Mans	1–1	2–1	0–4	1–1	2–0	2–1	2–1	2–1	2–2	1–1		1–1	2–2	1–1	0–1	1–0	1–1	2–1	0–0	0–0
Lorient	0–1	3–0	2–1	1–1	4–0	2–1	3–1	1–4	2–1	1–0	3–1		0–1	2–1	2–0	3–0	1–1	0–0	1–1	2–0
Martigues	2–1	1–1	0–0	2–2	0–1	0–1	0–0	0–0	1–3	2–3	3–3	1–1		0–1	2–1	0–1	1–0	1–1	2–0	1–0
Montpellier	2–0	1–1	0–1	2–0	2–0	0–0	1–1	5–0	1–0	1–0	0–0	2–2	2–0		1–1	3–0	3–1	1–0	0–2	2–1
Nancy	2–0	0–0	3–1	4–0	2–0	0–0	2–0	4–0	1–0	2–3	0–0	0–1	0–0	0–3		3–1	3–1	0–0	1–2	0–2
Nice	1–0	2–0	0–1	2–0	2–0	1–4	2–0	1–2	3–0	0–0	1–1	1–1	2–1	2–1	2–1		1–2	0–1	2–2	1–0
Nîmes	1–0	3–0	2–1	1–2	4–3	2–1	2–1	1–1	1–0	2–2	3–1	1–2	2–0	0–2	1–2	2–0		2–1	3–3	1–0
Niort	4–3	3–2	1–1	2–0	4–1	2–0	0–0	2–0	2–2	1–1	2–0	1–2	6–1	1–1	3–2	2–2	1–1		1–0	1–1
Sochaux	2–0	2–0	2–0	3–0	1–0	5–0	3–0	3–0	2–0	3–0	2–0	0–1	1–0	1–0	1–1	5–1	4–1	3–0		1–1
Wasquehal	2–0	3–1	0–2	3–3	3–0	3–1	1–1	2–1	2–1	0–1	2–1	0–1	2–0	1–1	0–1	2–1	1–1	0–0	1–1	

Source: Ligue 2
Legend: Blue = home team win; Yellow = draw; Red = away team win.

== Top goalscorers ==
Rank	Player	Club	Goals
1	(Tunisia) Francileudo Santos	Sochaux	21
2	(France) Alain Caveglia	Le Havre	16
3	(Ivory Coast) Élie Kroupi	Lorient	15
4	(France) Laurent Dufresne	Châteauroux	14
5	(France) Cyrille Watier	Caen	13
5	(France) David Suarez	Cannes	13
5	(France) Lilian Compan	Créteil	13
5	(France) Toifilou Maoulida	Montpellier	13
9	(France) Réginald Ray	Beauvais	12
9	(France) Lionel Rouxel	Laval	12
9	(France) Pierre-Alain Frau	Sochaux	12

== Attendances ==
#	Club	Average
1	Sochaux	12,951
2	Caen	10,490
3	MHSC	8,819
4	Le Havre	8,485
5	Lorient	6,768
6	La Berrichonne	6,451
7	Nancy	6,238
8	Nîmes	4,925
9	Stade lavallois	4,740
10	Chamois niortais	4,525
11	Le Mans	4,194
12	Angers	3,664
13	Nice	3,438
14	Gueugnon	3,082
15	Beauvais	2,906
16	Cannes	2,730
17	Martigues	1,949
18	Créteil	1,841
19	Wasquehal	1,427
20	Ajaccio	1,295
