= Aubanel =

Aubanel is a surname. Notable people with the surname include:

- Théodore Aubanel (1829–1886), French Provençal poet
- Christophe Aubanel (born 1976), French football player
- Georges Aubanel (1896–1978), French composer
