= Frédérik Viseux =

French footballer (born 1971)

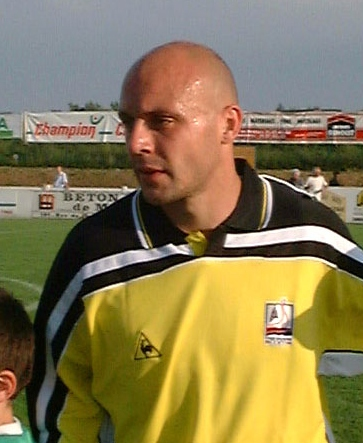
- Frédéric Viseux in 2000.

Personal information
- Date of birth: 7 May 1971 (age 55)
- Place of birth: Paris
- Position: Defender

Senior career*
Years	Team	Apps	(Gls)
1988–1989	ESA Brive		
1989–1991	Chamois Niortais		
1991–1993	ESA Brive		
1993–1995	Pau FC		
1995–1997	Amiens SC		
1997–1998	FC Sochaux-Montbéliard		
1998–2000	Lille OSC		
2000–2001	SM Caen		
2003–2005	CA Bastia		
- * Club domestic league appearances and goals

Frédérik Viseux (born 7 May 1971) is a retired French football defender.
