= Samba Sow (footballer, born 1984) =

Senegalese footballer

Personal information
- Full name: Samba Almany Sow
- Date of birth: 14 January 1984 (age 42)
- Place of birth: Dakar, Senegal
- Height: 1.80 m (5 ft 11 in)
- Position: Striker

Youth career
- Nancy

Senior career*
Years	Team	Apps	(Gls)
2001–2005	Nancy	3	(0)
2005	Virton		
2005–2006	Akratitos	8	(0)
2006–2007	Thyella	30	(12)
2007–2009	Panetolikos	4	(0)
2009–2010	Raon-l'Étape		
2010–2011	Andrézieux		
- * Club domestic league appearances and goals

Samba Almany Sow (born 14 January 1984) is a retired professional football striker.

== Career ==
Born in Dakar, Senegal, Sow previously played for AS Nancy-Lorraine in France's Ligue 2. (Note: Samba Sow – French league stats at LFP – also available in French (archived)) He also had a spell with Akratitos in the Greek Beta Ethniki.

After a good season while playing for Thyella in the Greek third division, he was acquired by Panetolikos F.C. On 28 January 2008, in a game against Thiva F.C., he broke his tibia and fibula, which kept him out of action until the end of the 2007–08 season, when his contract expired.
