= David Castilla =

French footballer (born 1977)

Personal information
- Date of birth: 6 July 1977 (age 49)
- Position: Goalkeeper

Senior career*
Years	Team	Apps	(Gls)
1995–1996	Nice	1	(0)
1996–1997	Nantes	11	(0)
1997–1999	Ayr United	44	(0)
1999–2000	Créteil	2	(0)
2000–2001	Beauvais	1	(0)
- * Club domestic league appearances and goals

David Castilla (born 6 July 1977) is a French former footballer who played as a goalkeeper.

He played for OGC Nice, (Note: David Castilla – French league stats at LFP – also available in French (archived)) FC Nantes, Ayr United F.C. and not France Under 21s (44 league games and eight cup games), US Créteil and AS Beauvais.
