= Riad Hammadou =

Algerian footballer (born 1976)

Personal information
- Full name: Riad Hammadou
- Date of birth: 5 December 1976 (age 49)
- Place of birth: Algiers, Algeria
- Height: 1.75 m (5 ft 9 in)
- Position: Midfielder

Youth career
- 1993–1996: Lille OSC

Senior career*
| Years | Team | Apps | (Gls) |
| 1996–2002 | Lille OSC | 45 | (0) |
| 2001 | → AS Beauvais Oise (loan) | 6 | (0) |
| 2002–2003 | PAS Giannina F.C. | 4 | (0) |
- * Club domestic league appearances and goals

Riad Hammadou (born December 5, 1976) is a former Algerian footballer. He played the majority of his career for the French club Lille OSC.

== Club career ==
Hammadou played for Lille and AS Beauvais Oise in the Ligue 1 and Ligue 2. (Note: Riad Hammadou – French league stats at LFP – also available in French (archived)) He also had a spell in the Super League Greece with PAS Giannina during the 2002–03 season. He suffered a serious knee injury during a match against Panathinaikos in March 2003, and his career ended after just four matches with the club.

== Honours ==
Lille OSC

- Ligue 2 : 2000
