= Christophe Ajas =

French footballer (born 1972)

Personal information
- Full name: Christophe Ajas
- Date of birth: 23 May 1972 (age 54)
- Place of birth: Toulouse, France
- Height: 1.74 m (5 ft 8 1/2 in)
- Position: Forward

Senior career*
Years	Team	Apps	(Gls)
1989–1994	AS Muret	115	(29)
1994–1995	LB Châteauroux	33	(4)
1995–1998	FC Gueugnon	60	(2)
1998–1999	Angoulême CFC	34	(6)
1999–2000	ES Fréjus	35	(8)
2000–2002	FC Martigues	25	(0)
2002–2007	Balma SC	86	(13)
- * Club domestic league appearances and goals

Christophe Ajas (born 23 May 1972) is a French former professional footballer who played as a forward. He played nine matches in Ligue 1 for FC Gueugnon.
