= Jean-Luc Escayol =

French footballer (born 1972)

Personal information
- Full name: Jean-Luc Escayol
- Date of birth: February 11, 1972 (age 54)
- Place of birth: Perpignan, France
- Height: 1.78 m (5 ft 10 in)
- Position: Midfielder

Team information
- Current team: Port-la-Nouvelle

Senior career*
Years	Team	Apps	(Gls)
1992–1997	Perpignan	131	(9)
1997–1999	Le Mans	46	(0)
1999–2000	Créteil	17	(0)
2000–2001	Chamois Niortais	22	(3)
2001–2002	Gazélec Ajaccio	24	(1)
2002–2003	Wasquehal	30	(0)
2003–2004	Sète	16	(0)
2004–2005	Martigues	26	(0)
2005–2007	Saint-Chinian	?	(?)
2007–	Port-la-Nouvelle	?	(?)
- * Club domestic league appearances and goals as of 18:57, 25 July 2009 (UTC)

Jean-Luc Escayol (born February 11, 1972) is a footballer currently playing for Division d'Honneur club Port-la-Nouvelle. He plays as a defensive midfielder.

== See also ==
- Football in France
- List of football clubs in France
