= Hervé Hagard =

French footballer (born 1971)

Personal information
- Full name: Hervé Hagard
- Date of birth: 9 November 1971 (age 54)
- Place of birth: Péronne, France
- Height: 1.80 m (5 ft 11 in)
- Position: Defensive midfielder

Senior career*
Years	Team	Apps	(Gls)
1989–1990	SC Abbeville		
1990–2000	AS Beauvais Oise	201	(6)
2000–2001	ES Wasquehal	13	(0)
2001–2005	Racing Paris	89	(3)
2005–2008	ES Wasquehal		
2008–2011	Entente CAFC Péronne		
- * Club domestic league appearances and goals

Hervé Hagard (born 9 November 1971) is a French former professional footballer who played as a defensive midfielder.
