= Stanisław Karwat =

Polish footballer (born 1965)

Personal information
- Date of birth: 3 October 1965 (age 61)
- Place of birth: Tomaszów Lubelski, Poland
- Height: 1.88 m (6 ft 2 in)
- Position: Goalkeeper

Youth career
- Tomasovia Tomaszów Lubelski

Senior career*
Years	Team	Apps	(Gls)
1983–1987	Motor Lublin	14	(0)
1987–1988	Stal Stalowa Wola	15	(0)
1988–1990	Jagiellonia Białystok	25	(0)
1991	Lublinianka		
1991–1995	La Roche		
1995–1996	Stade Poitevin	42	(0)
1996–1999	Nîmes Olympique	80	(0)
1999–2000	Beauvais Oise	28	(0)
2000–2002	Martigues	32	(0)
- * Club domestic league appearances and goals

Stanisław Karwat (born 3 October 1965) is a Polish former professional footballer who played as a goalkeeper.

== Career ==
Karwat started his career with Polish side Motor Lublin. He debuted for the club at the age of eighteen. In 1987, Karwat moved to Stal Stalowa Wola, where he stayed for one season, before joining fellow Ekstraklasa outfit Jagiellonia Białystok. In 1991, he moved to Lublinianka. In 1991, Karwat left Poland to join French side La Roche. In 1995, he joined Stade Poitevin. The following season, Karwat moved to Nîmes Olympique. He was described as having "three good seasons" while playing for the club. In 1999, he signed for French side AS Beauvais Oise. He helped the club achieve promotion. In 2000, he signed for French side FC Martigues.

== Style of play ==
Karwat operated as a goalkeeper. He was described as "distinguished by good physical conditions, coordination and skills".

== Personal life ==
Karwat is a native of Tomaszów Lubelski, Poland. After retiring from professional football, he worked as a manager.
