= Salah Bakour =

Algerian football player (born 1982)

Personal information
- Full name: Salaha Osman Bakour
- Date of birth: April 15, 1982 (age 44)
- Place of birth: Rouen, France
- Height: 1.74 m (5 ft 9 in)
- Position: Midfielder

Youth career
- 1988–1993: Cosmo Taverny
- 1993–1996: Red Star 93
- 1996–2000: AJ Auxerre

Senior career*
Years	Team	Apps	(Gls)
2000–2005	SM Caen	111	(1)
2005–2007	FC Istres	43	(0)
2007–2010	K.V. Kortrijk	23	(0)

International career^{‡}
2004	Algeria	1	(0)
- * Club domestic league appearances and goals as of April 17, 2010 ‡ National team caps and goals as of March 30, 2010

Salah Bakour (born April 15, 1982) is a former footballer. Born in France, he represented Algeria at international level.

== Honours ==
- Club:
  - Won the Coupe Gambardella once with AJ Auxerre in 1999
  - Finalist of the Coupe de la Ligue once with SM Caen in 2005
  - Won the Belgian Second Division Championship once with K.V. Kortrijk in 2008
- Country:
  - Has 1 cap for the Algeria National Team
