= Fabrice Catherine =

French footballer (born 1973)

Personal information
- Full name: Fabrice Catherine
- Date of birth: 12 May 1973 (age 53)
- Place of birth: Caen, France
- Height: 1.87 m (6 ft 2 in)
- Position: Goalkeeper

Youth career
- SM Caen

Senior career*
Years	Team	Apps	(Gls)
1997–2002	SM Caen	147	(0)
2002–2003	CS Sedan Ardennes	0	(0)
2003–2004	G.D. Estoril-Praia	33	(0)
2004–2006	Stade Lavallois	69	(0)
2006–2007	Tours FC	21	(0)
2007–2008	Stade Rennais	0	(0)
2008–2009	AS Cherbourg Football	37	(0)
- * Club domestic league appearances and goals

Fabrice Catherine (born 12 May 1973) is a French former footballer who played as a goalkeeper.
