= Jérôme Hiaumet =

French footballer (born 1979)

Personal information
- Date of birth: April 12, 1979 (age 47)
- Place of birth: Alençon, France
- Height: 1.83 m (6 ft 0 in)
- Position: Goalkeeper

Youth career
- 1992–1993: FC Alençonnaise
- 1993–1994: Stade Alençonnais
- 1994–1998: Caen

Senior career*
Years	Team	Apps	(Gls)
1998–1999	Caen	0	(0)
2000–2001	Caen	1	(0)
2001–2006	Stade Lavallois	41	(0)
2006–2008	FC Sète	108	(0)
2008–2010	AS Cannes	42	(0)
2010–2012	Angers SCO	17	(0)

International career
1997	France U18		
1999	France U21	3	(1)
- * Club domestic league appearances and goals

Jérôme Hiaumet (born 12 April 1979) is a French retired professional football player.

== Career ==
Born in Alençon, Hiaumet began playing club football as a goalkeeper with Stade Malherbe Caen. He only made one Ligue 2 appearance for the senior side before joining Stade Lavallois in 2001.

Hiaumet won the 1997 UEFA European Under-18 Championship with France.
