= Alain Behi =

Ivorian footballer (born 1978)

Personal information
- Full name: Alain Behi
- Date of birth: 1 July 1978 (age 48)
- Place of birth: Abidjan, Ivory Coast
- Height: 1.82 m (6 ft 0 in)
- Position: Midfielder

Senior career*
Years	Team	Apps	(Gls)
1996–2003	Châteauroux	96	(2)
2003–2004	Catania	25	(0)
2004–2006	RAEC Mons	35	(1)
2006–2008	Kallithea		
2008	PAS Giannina		
2008–2010	Randers FC	12	(0)
2010–2011	Ashford Town (Middlesex)	26	(2)

International career
	Ivory Coast	5	(0)
- * Club domestic league appearances and goals

Alain Behi (born 1 July 1978) is an Ivorian retired professional footballer who played as a midfielder.

== Club career ==
Behi played several years for French Ligue 2 side Châteauroux before moving on to play in the Belgium Jupiler League with RAEC Mons. He got to play 21 league games, scoring one goal in the 2004–05 season, but the club was relegated. He played 14 second level games in the 2005–06 season.

Behi signed a 1 1/2-year deal with Greek top-flight club Kallithea F.C. in January 2006, but moved on to the Greek second level side PAS Giannina, after Kallithea had also suffered relegation. Following a dispute about his contract at PAS Giannina, he left the club.

Behi was handed a successful trial at Danish Randers FC. He joined the club as they needed a defensive midfielder. He failed to achieve a regular place in the starting eleven only playing a few times. In the 2007–08 season he ruined Randers' chance of leading the fair play competition (for teams not already qualified for European competitions) completely by getting two yellow cards and thereby a red card against later relegated side Lyngby BK - a competition FC Nordsjælland later entered the UEFA Cup through. Although being one of Randers' most expensive players, Behi did not play a big part in Randers' success in the start of the 2008–09 season (having seven points after three matches) not having played single match as a starter and only being put on as a late substitute. Behi received further competition with the comeback of former Danish under-21 international Jonas Damborg from a long term injury and Swedish Bobbie Friberg da Cruz joining the team in the winter break.

He played for Ashford Town F.C. (Middlesex) in the Isthmian League Premier Division, returning to France at the end of the 2010–11 season.
