= Sébastien Lombard =

French footballer (born 1981)

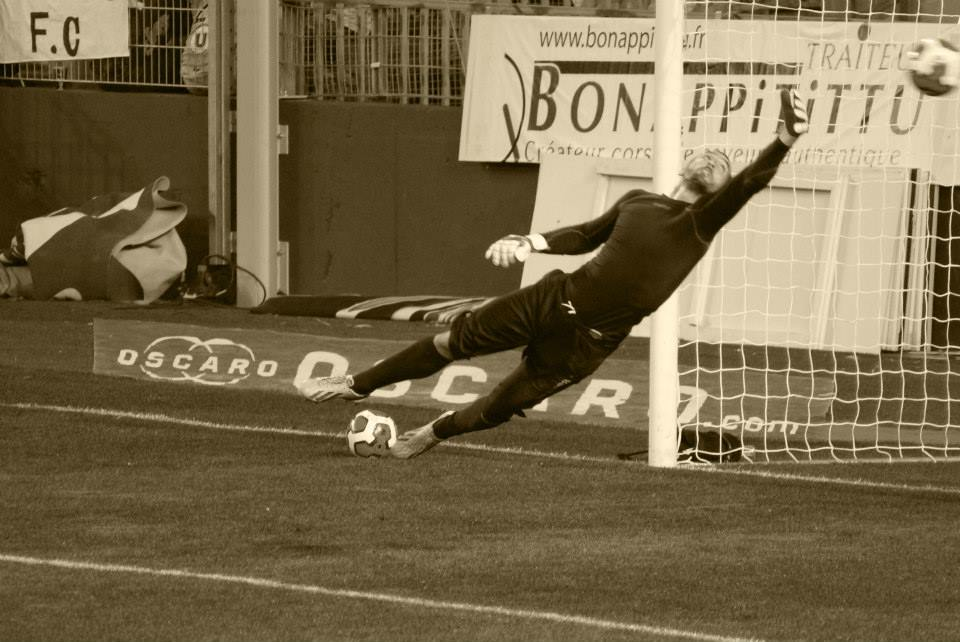
- Lombard in 2013

Personal information
- Date of birth: 20 August 1981 (age 45)
- Place of birth: Nice, France
- Height: 1.89 m (6 ft 2 in)
- Position: Goalkeeper

Team information
- Current team: Bastia (reserve team)

Senior career*
Years	Team	Apps	(Gls)
2000–2002	Martigues	1	(0)
2002–2003	Île-Rousse	31	(0)
2003–2008	Gazélec Ajaccio	92	(0)
2008–2009	Toulon	4	(0)
2009–2015	CA Bastia	197	(0)
2015–2019	Furiani-Agliani	74	(0)
2019–2021	Bastia	6	(0)
2022–	Bastia	0	(0)
Total		405	(0)
- * Club domestic league appearances and goals

Sébastien Lombard (born 20 August 1981) is a French former professional footballer who played as a goalkeeper.

In June 2021 SC Bastia announced that Lombard would retire and join the club's staff as assistant manager. A year later in 2022, he remained as part of the staff, and was integrated to the reserve squad as a starting goalkeeper, to help the youth players after gaining promotion.
