= Pascal Braud =

French footballer (born 1968)

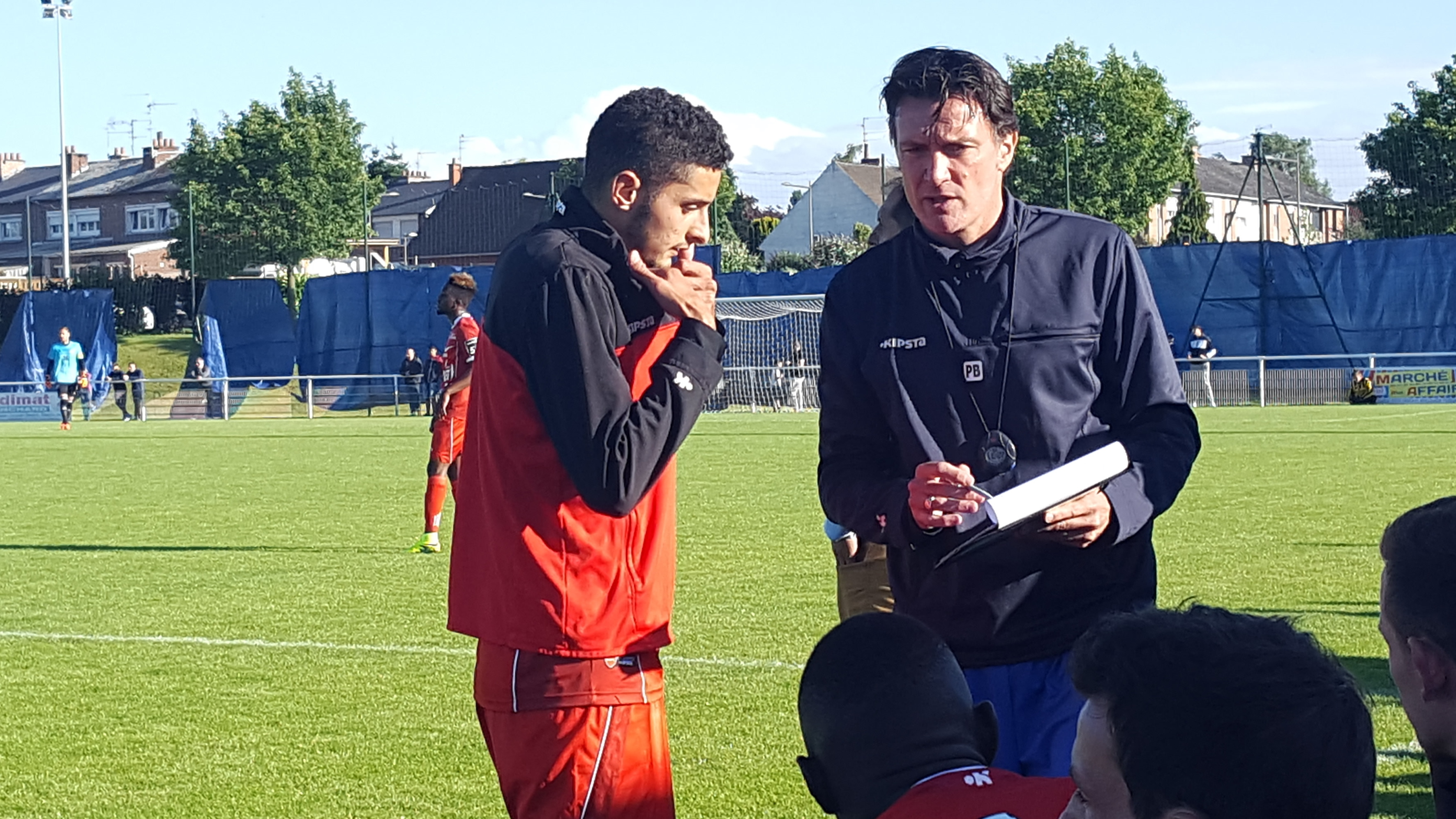

Personal information
- Full name: Pascal Braud
- Date of birth: 21 November 1968 (age 57)
- Place of birth: Sables d'Olonne, France
- Height: 1.91 m (6 ft 3 in)
- Position: Defender

Team information
- Current team: Laval (assistant manager)

Senior career*
Years	Team	Apps	(Gls)
1985–1989	Laval B	90	(9)
1989–1994	Laval	125	(7)
1994–1996	Saint-Brieuc	64	(4)
1996–1997	Troyes	35	(0)
1997–2001	Chamois Niortais	126	(6)
2001–2003	Caen	46	(0)
2003–2005	Dijon	45	(0)

Managerial career
- 2018: Laval (caretaker)
- 2019: Laval (caretaker)
- * Club domestic league appearances and goals

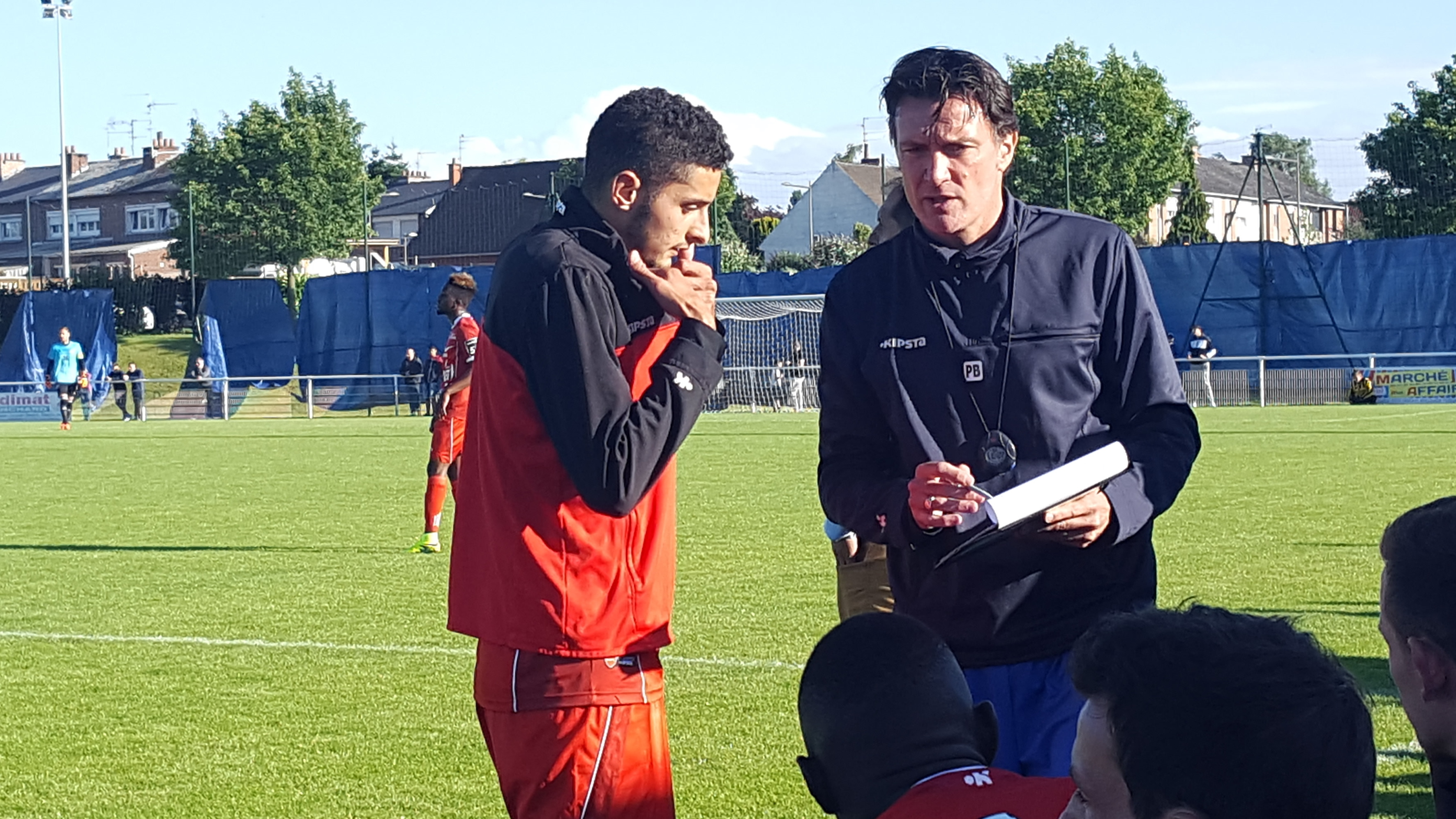
Pascal Braud (right) with a Valenciennes FC player (left) during the Valenciennes / UNFP FC friendly match on 2 July 2016 at the Stade des Navarres in Aniche

Pascal Braud (born 21 November 1968) is a French former professional footballer who played as a defender. He was twice caretaker manager of Stade Lavallois.
