= Christophe Aubanel =

French footballer (born 1976)

Personal information
- Date of birth: 3 November 1976 (age 49)
- Place of birth: Marseille, France
- Height: 1.68 m (5 ft 6 in)
- Position: Striker

Senior career*
Years	Team	Apps	(Gls)
1993–1994	Toulon (B team)		
1995–1996	US Marseille Endoume		
1996–1997	FA L'Île-Rousse Monticello		
1997–1998	USL Dunkerque		
1998	Boulogne		
1999	US Marseille Endoume		
1999–2000	AS Porto-Vecchio		
2000–2004	FC Gueugnon	100	(16)
2004	Lorient	6	(0)
2005–2006	US Créteil-Lusitanos	51	(4)
2006–2007	Istres	21	(2)
2007–2008	SO Cassis Carnoux		
2008–2009	Marseille (B team)		
2009–	Gazélec Ajaccio		
- * Club domestic league appearances and goals as of 20:26, 24 November 2009 (UTC)

Christophe Aubanel (born 3 November 1976) is a former French professional football player who last played for Gazélec Ajaccio.

He played on the professional level in Ligue 2 for FC Gueugnon, FC Lorient, US Créteil-Lusitanos and FC Istres. He signed for Lorient in 2004.

He played one game in the 2000–01 UEFA Cup for FC Gueugnon.

After retirement he was imprisoned for drug trafficking.
