= Nicolas Florentin =

French footballer (born 1978)

Personal information
- Date of birth: February 16, 1978 (age 48)
- Place of birth: Pont-à-Mousson, France
- Height: 1.78 m (5 ft 10 in)
- Position: Midfielder

Youth career
- AS Nancy

Senior career*
| Years | Team | Apps | (Gls) |
| 1997–2002 | AS Nancy | 30 | (5) |
| 1999–2001 | → AS Beauvais (loan) | 45 | (10) |
| 2002–2005 | Troyes AC | 52 | (4) |
| 2005–2010 | SM Caen | 66 | (11) |
| 2010–2012 | Angers SCO | 9 | (1) |
- * Club domestic league appearances and goals as of October 9, 2012

Nicolas Florentin (born February 16, 1978) is a French former football midfielder, who retired in 2012. He is currently the manager of the football club, AS Nancy-Lorraine B.
