= Olivier Bellisi =

French footballer (born 1975)

Personal information
- Date of birth: 25 November 1975 (age 49)
- Place of birth: Saint-Priest, Metropolis of Lyon, France
- Height: 1.77 m (5 ft 10 in)
- Position(s): Defender

Senior career*
Years	Team	Apps	(Gls)
1995–1998	Lyon	7	(0)
1998–1999	→ Caen (loan)	18	(1)
1999–2002	Caen	23	(0)
2000–2001	→ Louhans-Cuiseaux (loan)	26	(0)
2002–2004	Lyon Duchère	?	(?)
2004–2005	Mâcon	?	(?)
- *Club domestic league appearances and goals

Olivier Bellisi (born 25 November 1975) is a French former professional footballer who played as a defender. He began his career with Lyon, where he made seven league appearances in three seasons. After a season on loan with Caen, he joined the club permanently in 1999. Bellisi was again sent out on loan during the 2000–01 season, to Louhans-Cuiseaux. Following his release by Caen in 2002, he moved into semi-professional football.

== Career ==
=== Lyon ===
Bellisi started his career at Ligue 1 side Lyon, and was promoted from the youth team to the senior squad in 1995. He made his first-team debut in a 2–1 defeat away at Montpellier on 1 December 1995. Bellisi was named in the squad for the following match against Le Havre, in which he came on as a substitute for Florent Laville in the 63rd minute. In the 1996–97 season, he again made only sporadic appearances, playing three league matches for Lyon including the 1–0 win away at Metz on 26 March 1997. Bellisi was restricted to one substitute appearance in the 1997–98 season. His final match for Lyon came on 25 September 1997 when replaced Alain Caveglia in a 3–1 home defeat to Lens.

=== Caen and Louhans-Cuiseaux ===
In the 1998–99 season, Bellisi was sent out on loan to Ligue 2 club Caen. He made his debut for the club on 15 August 1998 in the 1–1 draw with Saint-Étienne. Two weeks later, Bellisi scored the first and only league goal of his career when he netted the opening goal in Caen's 2–0 win against Nice. During his loan spell at Caen, he played a total of 18 league matches and in June 1999, he completed a permanent move from Lyon. He played three matches in the 1999–2000 season, and spent the following campaign out on loan at Louhans-Cuiseaux in the Championnat National. Bellisi made 26 league appearances and played one game in the Coupe de France for Louhans-Cuiseaux before returning to Caen in the summer of 2001. In the 2001–02 season he played 20 games for Caen, but was released at the end of the campaign.

=== Later career ===
Upon his release by Caen, Bellisi did not find another professional club and joined Championnat de France amateur 2 side Lyon Duchère. He spent two seasons with the club before transferring to Mâcon, where he ended his career a year later.
