= Cyril Ramond =

French footballer (born 1980)

Personal information
- Date of birth: February 12, 1980 (age 46)
- Place of birth: Romans-sur-Isère, France
- Height: 1.75 m (5 ft 9 in)
- Position: Defender

Team information
- Current team: Rodez AF

Senior career*
Years	Team	Apps	(Gls)
1996–2000	ASOA Valence	54	(1)
2000–2004	Montpellier	34	(0)
2001–2002	→ Nancy (loan)	18	(0)
2005–2006	Sint-Truidense	5	(0)
2006–2007	FC Rhône Vallées		
2007–	Rodez AF		
- * Club domestic league appearances and goals as of 14:09, 20 November 2009 (UTC)

Cyril Ramond (born February 12, 1980) is a French professional football player. Currently, he plays in the Championnat National for Rodez AF.

He played on the professional level in Ligue 1 for Montpellier HSC, Ligue 2 for ASOA Valence, Montpellier HSC, AS Nancy and Stade Brestois 29 and Belgian First Division for K. Sint-Truidense V.V.

In March 2006, Ramond and two other players were questioned by the police as part of an investigation into match-fixing.
