= David Camara =

French football player (born 1976)

Personal information
- Date of birth: 23 September 1976 (age 50)
- Place of birth: Paris, France
- Height: 1.83 m (6 ft 0 in)
- Position: Midfielder

Team information
- Current team: AS Beauvais

Senior career*
Years	Team	Apps	(Gls)
1996–2000	Le Mans	74	(4)
2000–2001	AS Beauvais	32	(3)
2001–2003	Nancy	22	(1)
2003–2004	FC Rouen	25	(0)
2004–2005	RAAL		
2005–2006	Moissy Cramayel US		
2006–2007	Pacy Vallée-d'Eure		
2007–2008	FC Rouen		
2008–2009	US Orléans		
2009–2010	AS Beauvais		
- * Club domestic league appearances and goals

David Camara (born 23 September 1976) is a French former professional football player. Currently, he plays in the Championnat National for AS Beauvais Oise. He has played in Ligue 2 for Le Mans Union Club 72, AS Beauvais Oise, AS Nancy and FC Rouen.
