= Morlaye Cissé =

Guinean footballer

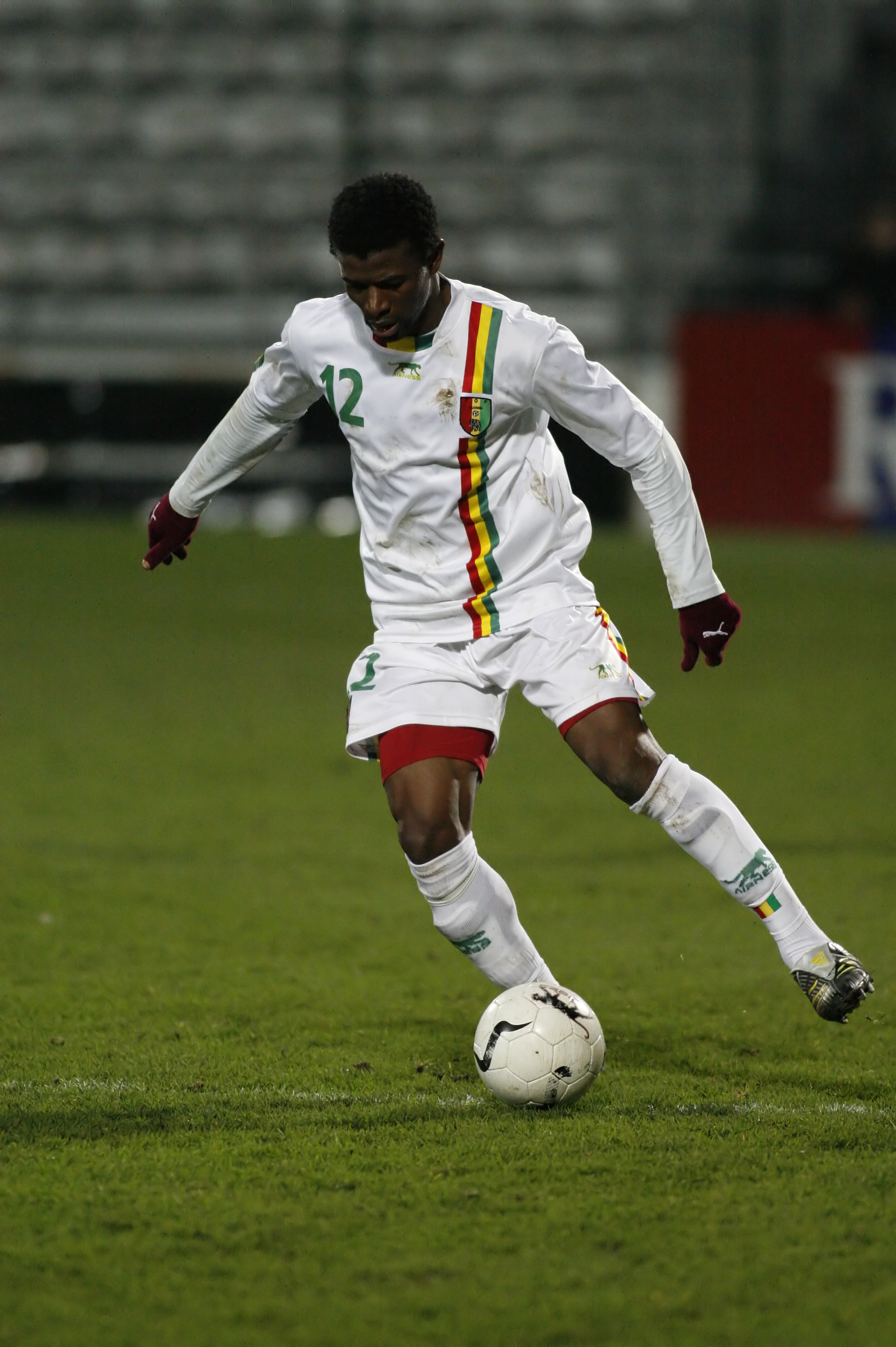
- Cissé with Guinea in 2007

Personal information
- Date of birth: 19 December 1983 (age 42)
- Place of birth: Conakry, Guinea
- Height: 1.80 m (5 ft 11 in)
- Position: Defender

Senior career*
Years	Team	Apps	(Gls)
2001	Horoya AC	18	(0)
2001–2003	Châteauroux	8	(0)
2003–2005	GSI Pontivy	31	(1)
2005–2006	Sedan	32	(0)
2006–2008	ES Viry-Châtillon	40	(0)
2008–2009	ASOA Issy	22	(0)
2009–2010	Mulhouse	15	(1)
2011–2012	EGS Gafsa	22	(0)

International career
2004–2012	Guinea	18	(0)
- * Club domestic league appearances and goals

Morlaye Cissé (born 19 December 1983) is a Guinean football coach and former player. A defender, he was a member of the Guinea squad for the 2006 African Nations Cup where the team were eliminated in the quarter-finals.

== Coaching career ==
In September 2022, Cissé was appointed coach of the Guinea U23 team. Under his leadership, the Syli U23 finished 4th at the 2023 African Cup of Nations in Morocco. Despite this performance, he was sacked by the Guinean Football Federation's Normalisation Committee on 24 July 2023. Following the election of Aboubacar Sampil as head of the Guinean Football Federation on 6 January 2024, he came back to the U-23 bench.
