= Vincent Guignery =

French footballer (born 1978)

Personal information
- Full name: Vincent Guignery
- Date of birth: 18 August 1978 (age 48)
- Place of birth: Sainte-Adresse, France
- Height: 1.75 m (5 ft 9 in)
- Position: Defender

Senior career*
Years	Team	Apps	(Gls)
1999–2001	Libourne-Saint-Seurin	56	(0)
2001–2003	Martigues	13	(0)
2003–2006	Boulogne	87	(0)
2006–2008	Quevilly	43	(1)
2008–2009	Beauvais	21	(0)
2009–2011	Chamois Niortais	44	(0)
2011–2013	RC Strasbourg	37	(1)
Total		301	(2)
- * Club domestic league appearances and goals as of 08:39, 29 October 2015 (UTC)

Vincent Guignery (born 18 August 1978) is a retired French footballer who played left-back. He previously played professionally in Ligue 2 for FC Martigues and also represented several other clubs, including Libourne-Saint-Seurin, Boulogne, Chamois Niortais and RC Strasbourg.

== Career ==
=== Early career ===
Guignery began his senior career in 1999, playing for FC Libourne-Saint-Seurin in the Championnat de France amateur, the fourth tier of the French football league system. In his two seasons with Libourne, Guignery played 57 league games, helping the team to consecutive 5th-place and 11th-place finishes.

At the end of that season, Guignery's contract expired and Libourne released him. His performances in the CFA had attracted bigger clubs, and in the summer of 2001, he signed for Ligue 2 side Martigues.

=== Martigues ===
Guignery found his first team opportunities limited in a higher division, making just 9 league appearances as the team ended the season bottom of the division, nine points adrift from safety. On their return to the Championnat National, the club finished fifth in the league. Guignery made only four more appearances for Martigues and his contract came to an end following the 2002–03 season, and he signed for another CFA side, US Boulogne.

=== Boulogne ===
In his first season with Boulogne, Guignery played 31 league games, and the team finished the season in 11th position. In Guignery's second season, the team finished top of the CFA Group A by two points, winning promotion to the Championnat National. The team also reached the quarter-finals of the Coupe de France.

In the club's first season back in the National division, they achieved a comfortable 6th-placed finish with Guignery playing 28 games in the league. In the summer of 2006, Boulogne decided not to renew Guignery's contract, and he returned to the CFA, signing for Quevilly.

=== Quevilly ===
Guignery's first season with Quevilly was largely uneventful, with the team securing safety seven points ahead of Pontivy, finishing 14th in the CFA Group D. For the 2007–08 term, the team was moved to the CFA Group A, and the season was more successful for the club as they finished 3rd behind Pacy Vallée-d'Eure and FC Rouen, missing out on the league title and promotion by six points. Guignery's performances in the lower leagues had again alerted professional clubs, and in July 2008, he signed for Championnat National side AS Beauvais Oise.

=== Beauvais ===
Guignery played 21 league games in his only season with Beauvais as the team cemented a 10th-placed finish in the Championnat National.

=== Chamois Niortais ===
On 6 July 2009, it was announced that he had agreed to a one-year contract with Niort, as the club aimed to return to the Championnat National at the first attempt. He went on to play 44 league matches for Niort before leaving at the end of the 2010–11 season.
