= Daniel Koffi-Konan =

Ivorian footballer

Personal information
- Date of birth: 1 August 1981 (age 45)
- Place of birth: Bouaké, Ivory Coast
- Height: 1.85 m (6 ft 1 in)
- Position: Striker

Team information
- Current team: FC Martigues

Senior career*
Years	Team	Apps	(Gls)
1999–2004	FC Martigues	46	(5)
2001–2002	→ Pau FC (loan)		
2004–2005	SN Imphy Decize		
2005–2006	AC Arles		
2006–2007	UA Cognac		
2008	AS Gardanne		
2009–	FC Martigues		
- * Club domestic league appearances and goals as of 13:53, 27 November 2009 (UTC)

Daniel Koffi-Konan (born 1 August 1981 in Bouaké) is an Ivorian professional football player. Currently, he plays in the Championnat de France amateur for FC Martigues.

He played on the professional level in Ligue 2 for FC Martigues.
