= Christophe Borbiconi =

French football player and manager (born 1973)

Personal information
- Date of birth: 26 February 1973 (age 53)
- Place of birth: Villerupt, France
- Height: 1.85 m (6 ft 1 in)
- Position: Centre-back

Youth career
- –1992: Nancy

Senior career*
Years	Team	Apps	(Gls)
1992–1995	Nancy	37	(1)
1995–2000	Louhans-Cuiseaux	113	(6)
1998–1999	→ Sedan (loan)	24	(0)
2000–2001	Beauvais	27	(0)
2001–2002	Nîmes	21	(1)
2002–2004	Alès		
2004–2009	Dudelange		

Managerial career
- 2010–2012: Thionville
- * Club domestic league appearances and goals

Christophe Borbiconi (born 26 February 1973) is a French former professional football player and manager. As a player, he was a centre-back. He scored eight goals in 222 Division 2 games in France.

== Personal life ==
Christophe's younger brother Stéphane is also a former footballer.

== Honours ==
Sedan

- Coupe de France runner-up: 1998–99
