= Guillaume Boronad =

French professional football player (born 1979)

Personal information
- Date of birth: 5 May 1979 (age 47)
- Place of birth: Perpignan, France
- Height: 1.71 m (5 ft 7 1/2 in)
- Position: Midfielder

Team information
- Current team: Toulon

Senior career*
Years	Team	Apps	(Gls)
1996–1997	Sporting Perpignan	5	(0)
1997–2000	Bordeaux (B team)		
2000–2001	Sporting Perpignan		
2001–2003	FC Martigues		
2003–2005	FC Rouen		
2005–2006	Penafiel	12	(0)
2006–2008	FC Martigues		
2008–2009	AS Cannes		
2009–2010	ES Fréjus		
2010–	Toulon		
- * Club domestic league appearances and goals as of 20:28, 17 November 2009 (UTC)

Guillaume Boronad (born 5 May 1979) is a French professional football player. Currently, he plays in the Championnat de France amateur for Sporting Toulon Var.

He played on the professional level in Ligue 2 for Sporting Perpignan Roussillon and FC Rouen and in the Portuguese Liga for F.C. Penafiel. in 2009, after reports claimed he had signed for Leeds United, Leeds denied reports claiming they had never heard of the player. When the player was later asked by a Leeds supporter why he had not signed for the club via social networking site Facebook, he responded with the now famous WACCOE quip "Sorry. My agent betrayed"
