= Jérôme Bottelin =

French footballer (born 1978)

Personal information
- Date of birth: May 3, 1978 (age 48)
- Place of birth: Nancy, France
- Height: 1.75 m (5 ft 9 in)
- Position: Striker

Team information
- Current team: US Raon-l'Étape

Senior career*
Years	Team	Apps	(Gls)
1994–2001	Nancy (B team)		
1996–2001	Nancy	44	(4)
1999	→ US Raon-l'Étape (loan)		
2001–2002	AS Beauvais	28	(1)
2002–2003	Valenciennes		
2003–2004	AS Angoulême		
2004–	US Raon-l'Étape		
- * Club domestic league appearances and goals as of 15:45, 24 November 2009 (UTC)

Jérôme Bottelin (born May 3, 1978, in Nancy) is a French professional football player. Currently, he plays in the Championnat de France amateur for US Raon-l'Étape.

He played on the professional level in Ligue 1 for AS Nancy and in Ligue 2 for AS Nancy and AS Beauvais Oise.
