= Tagro Baléguhé =

Ivorian footballer

Personal information
- Full name: Tagro Baléguhé
- Date of birth: 23 March 1978 (age 48)
- Place of birth: Zoukougbeu, Ivory Coast
- Height: 1.85 m (6 ft 1 in)
- Position: Striker

Senior career*
Years	Team	Apps	(Gls)
2000–2001	Marseille		
2001–2003	Martigues		
2003–2004	Rouen	19	(2)
2004–2005	Gueugnon	29	(7)
2005–2007	Reims	48	(8)
2007–2008	Nîmes		
2008–2009	Arles-Avignon		
- * Club domestic league appearances and goals

Tagro Baléguhé (born 23 March 1978) is a former Ivorian footballer who played as a striker. He began his career at French club Olympique de Marseille, before moving to FC Martigues. In 2005, he joined Reims. (Note: Tagro Baléguhé – French league stats at LFP – also available in French (archived))
