= Sadio Sow =

Senegalese footballer

Personal information
- Full name: Sadio Sow
- Date of birth: March 13, 1976 (age 50)
- Place of birth: Dakar, Senegal
- Height: 1.79 m (5 ft 10 1/2 in)
- Position: Winger

Team information
- Current team: Strasbourg
- Number: 13

Senior career*
Years	Team	Apps	(Gls)
1995–1998	Nantes	0	(0)
1998–2000	Gazélec Ajaccio	42	(4)
2000–2001	Niort	25	(0)
2001–2002	Nancy	1	(0)
2002	Preston North End	13	(0)
2002–2006	Créteil	52	(0)
2007–2008	Wydad Casablanca	6	(0)
2008–2009	Kawkab Marrakech	4	(1)
2009–2010	Nîmes	32	(0)
2010–2011	Cherbourg	22	(0)
- * Club domestic league appearances and goals as of 20:53, 20 September 2009 (UTC)

Sadio Sow (born March 13, 1976) is a retired Senegalese association football player who last played as a winger for Cherbourg.
