= Frédéric Coquerel =

French footballer (born 1978)

Personal information
- Date of birth: 25 November 1978 (age 47)
- Place of birth: Bernay, France
- Height: 1.80 m (5 ft 11 in)
- Position: Forward

Senior career*
Years	Team	Apps	(Gls)
2001–2003	Caen	36	(6)
2003–2004	Beauvais	31	(4)
2004–2005	Tours	35	(6)
2005–2006	Vannes	24	(2)
2006–2007	Orléans	17	(10)
2007–2008	Vannes	0	(0)
2008–2010	Avenir de Theix	?	(?)
- * Club domestic league appearances and goals

Frédéric Coquerel (born 25 November 1978) is a retired French footballer who played as a forward. He played professionally for Caen in Ligue 2 between 2001 and 2003.
