= Réginald Ray =

French footballer and manager (born 1968)

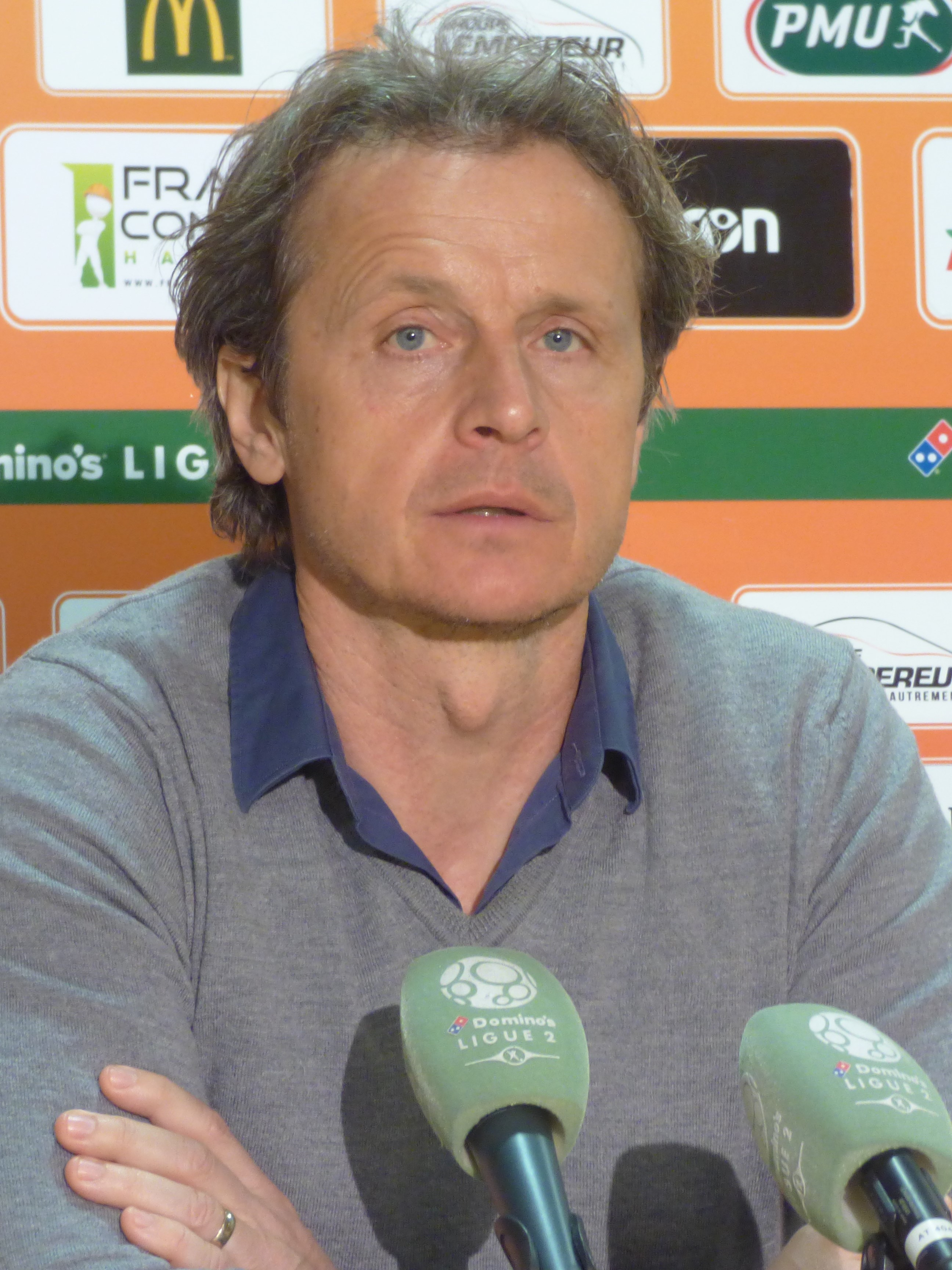
- Ray during a press conference as Valenciennes manager in 2019

Personal information
- Date of birth: 31 October 1968 (age 58)
- Place of birth: Cucq, France
- Height: 1.80 m (5 ft 11 in)
- Position: Striker

Senior career*
Years	Team	Apps	(Gls)
1987–1992	Montceau	53	(23)
1992–1994	Istres	106	(31)
1994–1995	Stade Briochin	38	(16)
1995–1996	Guingamp	16	(1)
1996–1997	Gueugnon	30	(5)
1997–1999	Le Mans	58	(27)
1999–2000	Châteauroux	35	(10)
2000–2001	Beauvais	31	(12)
2001–2002	Nîmes	14	(0)
2004–2005	Rumilly Albanais		
Total		381	(125)

Managerial career
- 2006–2008: Rumilly Albanais
- 2008–2010: Boulogne (under-21s)
- 2010–2015: Bastia (assistant)
- 2015–2016: Aston Villa (assistant)
- 2016–2017: Paris FC
- 2017: Bastia
- 2017–2019: Valenciennes
- 2020: Le Mans
- 2022–2024: Le Mans
- 2024: Strasbourg (assistant)
- 2025–2026: Bastia
- * Club domestic league appearances and goals

Réginald Ray (born 31 October 1968) is a French football manager and former player.

Ray spent the majority of his 15-year career in the French lower divisions. In 1991, while playing in the Championnat National with Montceau, he was the league's top scorer. Ray was top scorer again in 1998, this time in Ligue 2 while playing for Le Mans.

== Managerial career ==
In 2008, Ray became the under-21 manager for Boulogne. As well as managing the under-21s, Ray also helped coach the team's strikers. In 2010, after two years at Boulogne, he left the club in order to become assistant manager to Frédéric Hantz at Bastia.

On 1 November 2015, it was reported that former Lyon manager Rémi Garde was on the verge of becoming the new manager of Aston Villa, and after unsuccessful attempts to bring his former coaching staff with him, would be appointing Ray as his assistant manager. On 1 April 2016, a club statement stated Ray had left Aston Villa.

Ray returned to manage Bastia in June 2017.

In October 2017, Ray became new manager of Valenciennes. He left after two seasons at the end of his contract.

In March 2020, he was appointed manager of Le Mans. He was released from duties when the club were relegated at the end of the 2019–20 Ligue 2 season.

On 25 June 2024, Ray was hired by Strasbourg as an assistant to Patrick Vieira. However, Vieira left Strasbourg less than a month later. Ray left as well.

== Honours ==
Istres

- Coupe de Provence: 1993

Guingamp

- UEFA Intertoto Cup: 1996

Individual

- Division 3 top scorer: 1990–91
- Division 2 top scorer: 1997–98
