= Stéphane Borbiconi =

French footballer (born 1979)

Personal information
- Date of birth: March 22, 1979 (age 47)
- Place of birth: Villerupt, France
- Height: 1.84 m (6 ft 0 in)
- Position: Center back

Youth career
- 1997–1999: FC Metz

Senior career*
Years	Team	Apps	(Gls)
1999–2006	FC Metz	134	(12)
2001–2002	→ FC Martigues (loan)	35	(2)
2006–2009	Manisaspor	67	(2)
2009–2011	FC Metz	26	(1)
2010–2011	→ FC Baku (loan)	20	(3)
- * Club domestic league appearances and goals as of February 1, 2012

Stéphane Borbiconi (born March 22 1979, in Villerupt, France) is a French football player.

== Career ==
Borbiconi began his career with FC Metz who was 1999 promoted to the first team and was loaned out in summer 2001 to FC Martigues. After his return from this loan with FC Martigues played for FC Metz from 2002 until 2006 before signed with Manisaspor. On 7 July 2009 FC Metz have signed the French defender from Turkish club Manisaspor on a three-year deal. He was loaned in 2010 to Azerbaijani side FC Baku.

== Personal life ==
Stéphane's brother Christophe is also a former footballer.
