= Laurent Dufresne =

French footballer (born 1972)

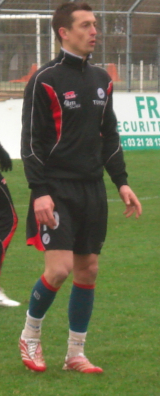
- Dufresne in training

Personal information
- Date of birth: 2 March 1972 (age 54)
- Place of birth: Calais, France
- Height: 1.81 m (5 ft 11 in)
- Position: Striker

Senior career*
Years	Team	Apps	(Gls)
1992–1996	Valenciennes	34	(11)
1997–2001	Châteauroux	158	(48)
2001–2005	Nancy	104	(37)
2005–2007	Valenciennes	22	(8)
2007–2008	Châteauroux	29	(11)
Total		347	(115)
- * Club domestic league appearances and goals

Laurent Dufresne (born 2 March 1972) is a French former professional footballer who played as a striker. He is the former team captain of Valenciennes FC (the title was passed on to Éric Chelle). Over his entire career, which started in 1992, he scored over 100 goals in over 300 appearances.

== Career ==
=== Early career ===
Dufresne first played professionally in 1992 when for the Valenciennes FC. He spent a full five years there before he was transferred.

=== Châteauroux ===
Dufresne spent four years at Châteauroux, from the start of 1997 to 2001. He made his most appearances and scored the most goals at the club.

=== Nancy ===
Dufresne spent four years at AS Nancy. From the 2001 season to the 2005 season, he proved to be an invaluable striker, with an average of one goal per three games.

=== Return to Valenciennes ===
The 2005–06 season saw Dufresne return to Valenciennes FC, where he had first started his professional football career. He became team captain of the group leading the club to the French Second Division championship and French First Division promotion.

He returned to Châteauroux in 2007 before retiring the following year.
