= 2001–02 Amiens SC season =

Amiens SC
2001–02 season
- Head coach: Denis Troch
- Stadium: Stade de la Licorne
- French Division 2: 12th
- Coupe de France: Round of 64
- Coupe de la Ligue: Round of 16

The 2001–02 season was the 101st season in the history of Amiens SC and the club's first season back in the second division of French football. In addition to the domestic league, Amiens SC competed in this season's editions of the Coupe de France and Coupe de la Ligue. The season covered the period from 1 July 2001 to 30 June 2002.

== Players ==
=== First-team squad ===
Note: Flags indicate national team as defined under FIFA eligibility rules; some limited exceptions apply. Players may hold more than one non-FIFA nationality.

| No. | Pos. | Nation | Player |
|---|---|---|---|
| — | GK | FRA | Cyrille Merville |
| — | GK | FRA | Sébastien Maté |
| — | GK | FRA | Julien Lachuer |
| — | DF | FRA | Michel Rodriguez |
| — | DF | TOG | Jean-Paul Abalo |
| — | DF | FRA | Julien Outrebon |
| — | DF | GUA | Philippe Durpes |
| — | DF | MAR | Laurent Strzelczak |
| — | DF | FRA | Christophe Wargnier |
| — | DF | FRA | Arnaud Lebrun |
| — | DF | FRA | Jean-Marie Stephanopoli |
| — | DF | FRA | Ludovic Leroy |
| — | MF | CGO | Oscar Ewolo |
| — | MF | FRA | Emmanuel Duchemin |

| No. | Pos. | Nation | Player |
|---|---|---|---|
| — | MF | FRA | Fabrice Abriel |
| — | MF | FRA | Thierry Moreau |
| — | MF | ALG | Lakhdar Adjali |
| — | MF | TUN | Fahid Ben Khalfallah |
| — | MF | MAR | Abdellah Kharbouchi |
| — | FW | CIV | Hamed Diallo |
| — | FW | FRA | Jean-François Rivière |
| — | FW | COD | Guylain Ndumbu-Nsungu |
| — | FW | FRA | Peter Sampil |
| — | FW | FRA | Emmanuel Coquelet |
| — | FW | FRA | Xavier Chalier |
| — | FW | FRA | Grégory Dufrennes |

== Transfers ==
=== In ===
| No. | Pos | Player | Transferred from | Fee | Date | Source |
|---|---|---|---|---|---|---|
| – | MF | (Tunisia) Fahid Ben Khalfallah | (France) Péronne | | 1 July 2001 | |
| – | FW | (Ivory Coast) Hamed Diallo | (France) Laval | | 1 July 2001 | |
| – | GK | (France) Sébastien Maté | (France) Laval | | 1 July 2001 | |
| – | DF | (France) Julien Outrebon | (France) | | 1 July 2001 | |
| – | DF | (France) Jean-Marie Stephanopoli | (France) Laval | | 1 July 2001 | |
| – | MF | (France) Fabrice Abriel | (France) Paris Saint-Germain | Loan | 5 July 2001 | |
| – | MF | (France) Thierry Moreau | (France) Toulouse FC | | 18 July 2001 | |
| – | DF | (France) Michel Rodriguez | (France) Montpellier | | 1 August 2001 | |

=== Out ===
| No. | Pos | Player | Transferred to | Fee | Date | Source |
|---|---|---|---|---|---|---|
| – | MF | (France) Emmerick Darbelet | (France) Ajaccio | | 1 July 2001 | |
| – | FW | (France) Stéphane Lecocq | (France) Rouen | Free | 1 July 2001 | |
| – | DF | (France) Thomas Mienniel | (France) Tours | | 1 July 2001 | |
| – | DF | (France) Cédric Fontaine | (France) Créteil | | 1 July 2001 | |
| – | MF | (France) Guy Mukoko | (France) SC Abbeville | | 1 July 2001 | |
| – | DF | (Romania) Valentin Necsulescu | | | 1 July 2001 | |
| – | GK | (France) Philippe Poil | N/A | Retired | 1 July 2001 | |
| – | FW | (France) Claude-Arnaud Rivenet | (France) La Louvière | | 1 July 2001 | |
| – | MF | (France) Stéphane Rondelaere | (Spain) Gimnàstic | | 1 July 2001 | |

== Pre-season and friendlies ==
Win Draw Loss

| 18 July 2001 Friendly | Amiens (France) | 0–3 | (France) Lens | Amiens, France |
| 19:00 CEST (UTC+2) | | | Sikora 12'; Blanchard 23'; Rodriguez 83' | Stadium: Stade de la Licorne; Attendance: 6,218; Referee: M. Cotrel |

| 20 April 2002 Friendly | Lens (France) | 1–1 | (France) Amiens | Béthune, France |
| 17:00 CEST (UTC+2) | Diouf 4' | | Diallo 75' | Stadium: stade municipal Attendance: 2,000; Referee: M. Lannoy |

== Competitions ==
=== Overall record ===
| Competition | First match | Last match | Starting round | Final position | Record | | | | | | | |
| Competition | First match | Last match | Starting round | Final position | Pld | W | D | L | GF | GA | GD | Win % |
|---|---|---|---|---|---|---|---|---|---|---|---|---|
| Division 2 | 28 July 2001 | 3 May 2002 | Matchday 1 | 12th | 38 | 11 | 14 | 13 | 46 | 50 | −4 | 28.95 |
| Coupe de France | November 2001 | TBD | Seventh round | Round of 64 | 3 | 2 | 0 | 1 | 2 | 2 | +0 | 66.67 |
| Coupe de la Ligue | September 2001 | TBD | First round | Round of 16 | 3 | 2 | 0 | 1 | 4 | 3 | +1 | 66.67 |
| Total | | | | | 44 | 15 | 14 | 15 | 52 | 55 | −3 | 34.09 |

Source: Competitions

=== French Division 2 ===
==== League table ====
| Pos | Team | Pld | W | D | L | GF | GA | GD | Pts |
|---|---|---|---|---|---|---|---|---|---|
| 10 | Laval | 38 | 14 | 8 | 16 | 50 | 56 | −6 | 50 |
| 11 | Niort | 38 | 11 | 15 | 12 | 40 | 39 | +1 | 48 |
| 12 | Amiens | 38 | 11 | 14 | 13 | 46 | 50 | −4 | 47 |
| 13 | Saint-Étienne | 38 | 11 | 13 | 14 | 35 | 42 | −7 | 46 |
| 14 | Gueugnon | 38 | 9 | 17 | 12 | 42 | 49 | −7 | 44 |

Source: Ligue 2

==== Results summary ====
| Overall | | | | | | | | Home | | | | | | Away | | | | | |
| Pld | W | D | L | GF | GA | GD | Pts | W | D | L | GF | GA | GD | W | D | L | GF | GA | GD |
|---|---|---|---|---|---|---|---|---|---|---|---|---|---|---|---|---|---|---|---|
| 38 | 11 | 14 | 13 | 46 | 50 | −4 | 47 | 9 | 4 | 6 | 26 | 20 | +6 | 2 | 10 | 7 | 20 | 30 | −10 |

Source: Ligue 2

==== Results by round ====
| Round | 1 | 2 | 3 | 4 | 5 | 6 | 7 | 8 | 9 | 10 | 11 | 12 | 13 | 14 | 15 | 16 | 17 | 18 | 19 | 20 | 21 | 22 | 23 | 24 | 25 | 26 | 27 | 28 | 29 | 30 | 31 | 32 | 33 | 34 | 35 | 36 | 37 | 38 |
|---|---|---|---|---|---|---|---|---|---|---|---|---|---|---|---|---|---|---|---|---|---|---|---|---|---|---|---|---|---|---|---|---|---|---|---|---|---|---|
| Ground | H | A | H | A | H | A | H | A | H | A | A | H | A | H | A | H | A | H | A | H | A | H | A | H | A | H | A | H | H | A | H | A | H | A | H | A | H | A |
| Result | L | D | W | L | W | W | W | D | D | D | L | W | L | D | W | W | L | L | D | D | L | L | D | W | L | L | D | W | D | D | W | D | L | L | L | D | W | D |
| Position | 17 | 17 | 7 | 10 | 9 | 5 | 5 | 5 | 5 | 5 | 8 | 6 | 7 | 7 | 6 | 6 | 6 | 7 | 6 | 8 | 10 | 10 | 8 | 7 | 9 | 11 | 12 | 7 | 8 | 9 | 9 | 9 | 12 | 12 | 12 | 12 | 11 | 12 |

Source: Ligue 2
A = Away; H = Home; W = Win; D = Draw; L = Loss

==== Matches ====
| 28 July 2001 1 | Amiens | 0–1 | Beauvais | Amiens |
| 20:00 CEST (UTC+2) | | Report | Vairelles 89' | Stadium: Stadio Arechi; Attendance: 7,888; Referee: Daniel Feuillade |

| 4 August 2001 2 | Nancy | 1–1 | Amiens | Tomblaine |
| 20:00 CEST (UTC+2) | Dufresne 18' | Report | Durpes 13' | Stadium: Stadio Arechi; Referee: Bruno Derrien |

| 11 August 2001 3 | Amiens | 3–0 | Grenoble | Amiens |
| --:-- CEST (UTC+2) | | | | Stadium: Stade de la Licorne |

| 18 August 2001 4 | Châteauroux | 2–0 | Amiens | Châteauroux |
| --:-- CEST (UTC+2) | | | | Stadium: Stade Gaston-Petit |

| 25 August 2001 5 | Amiens | 2–1 | Créteil | Amiens |
| --:-- CEST (UTC+2) | | | | Stadium: Stade de la Licorne |

| 29 August 2001 6 | Caen | 2–4 | Amiens | Caen |
| --:-- CEST (UTC+2) | | | | Stadium: Stade Michel d'Ornano |

| 8 September 2001 7 | Amiens | 2–1 | Saint-Étienne | Amiens |
| --:-- CEST (UTC+2) | | | | Stadium: Stade de la Licorne |

| 15 September 2001 8 | Le Mans | 1–1 | Amiens | Le Mans |
| --:-- CEST (UTC+2) | | | | Stadium: Stade Léon-Bollée |

| 22 September 2001 9 | Amiens | 1–1 | Ajaccio | Amiens |
| --:-- CEST (UTC+2) | | | | Stadium: Stade de la Licorne |

| 29 September 2001 10 | Wasquehal | 0–0 | Amiens | Villeneuve-d'Ascq |
| --:-- CEST (UTC+2) | | | | Stadium: Stadium Lille Métropole |

| 5 October 2001 11 | Gueugnon | 2–1 | Amiens | Gueugnon |
| --:-- CEST (UTC+2) | | | | Stadium: Stade Jean Laville |

| 13 October 2001 12 | Amiens | 4–0 | Martigues | Amiens |
| --:-- CEST (UTC+2) | | | | Stadium: Stade de la Licorne |

| 20 October 2001 13 | Le Havre | 2–1 | Amiens | Le Havre |
| --:-- CEST (UTC+2) | | | | Stadium: Stade Jules Deschaseaux |

| 27 October 2001 14 | Amiens | 1–1 | Laval | Amiens |
| --:-- CEST (UTC+2) | | | | Stadium: Stade de la Licorne |

| 9 November 2001 15 | Istres | 1–2 | Amiens | Istres |
| --:-- CEST (UTC+2) | | | | Stadium: Stade Bernard Bardin |

| 14 November 2001 16 | Amiens | 2–0 | Nice | Amiens |
| --:-- CEST (UTC+2) | | | | Stadium: Stade de la Licorne |

| 17 November 2001 17 | Strasbourg | 1–0 | Amiens | Strasbourg |
| --:-- CEST (UTC+2) | | | | Stadium: Stade de la Meinau |

| 28 November 2001 18 | Amiens | 0–2 | Niort | Amiens |
| --:-- CEST (UTC+2) | | | | Stadium: Stade de la Licorne |

| 8 December 2001 19 | Nîmes | 1–1 | Amiens | Nîmes |
| --:-- CEST (UTC+2) | | | | Stadium: Stade des Costières |

| 19 December 2001 20 | Amiens | 1–1 | Nancy | Amiens |
| --:-- CEST (UTC+2) | | | | Stadium: Stade de la Licorne |

| 22 December 2001 21 | Grenoble | 4–0 | Amiens | Grenoble |
| --:-- CEST (UTC+2) | | | | Stadium: Stade Lesdiguières |

| 12 January 2002 23 | Créteil | 1–1 | Amiens | Créteil |
| --:-- CEST (UTC+2) | | | | Stadium: Stade Dominique Duvauchelle |

| 23 January 2002 24 | Amiens | 3–2 | Caen | Amiens |
| --:-- CEST (UTC+2) | | | | Stadium: Stade de la Licorne |

| 30 January 2002 25 | Saint-Étienne | 2–1 | Amiens | Saint-Étienne |
| --:-- CEST (UTC+2) | | | | Stadium: Stade Geoffroy-Guichard |

| 2 February 2002 26 | Amiens | 0–4 | Le Mans | Amiens |
| --:-- CEST (UTC+2) | | | | Stadium: Stade de la Licorne |

| 6 February 2002 27 | Ajaccio | 1–1 | Amiens | Ajaccio |
| --:-- CEST (UTC+2) | | | | Stadium: Stade François Coty |

| 12 February 2002 28 | Amiens | 2–0 | Wasquehal | Amiens |
| --:-- CEST (UTC+2) | | | | Stadium: Stade de la Licorne |

| 16 February 2002 29 | Amiens | 0–0 | Gueugnon | Amiens |
| --:-- CEST (UTC+2) | | | | Stadium: Stade de la Licorne |

| 23 February 2002 30 | Martigues | 1–1 | Amiens | Martigues |
| --:-- CEST (UTC+2) | | | | Stadium: Stade Francis Turcan |

| 2 March 2002 22 | Amiens | 0–1 | Châteauroux | Amiens |
| --:-- CEST (UTC+2) | | | | Stadium: Stade de la Licorne |

| 7 March 2002 31 | Amiens | 2–0 | Le Havre | Amiens |
| --:-- CEST (UTC+2) | | | | Stadium: Stade de la Licorne |

| 16 March 2002 32 | Laval | 2–2 | Amiens | Laval |
| --:-- CEST (UTC+2) | | | | Stadium: Stade Francis Le Basser |

| 23 March 2002 33 | Amiens | 1–2 | Istres | Amiens |
| --:-- CEST (UTC+2) | | | | Stadium: Stade de la Licorne |

| 26 March 2002 34 | Nice | 3–0 | Amiens | Nice |
| --:-- CEST (UTC+2) | | | | Stadium: Stade du Ray |

| 5 April 2002 35 | Amiens | 0–2 | Strasbourg | Amiens |
| --:-- CEST (UTC+2) | | | | Stadium: Stade de la Licorne |

| 13 April 2002 36 | Niort | 2–2 | Amiens | Niort |
| --:-- CEST (UTC+2) | | | | Stadium: Stade René Gaillard |

| 26 April 2002 37 | Amiens | 2–1 | Nîmes | Amiens |
| --:-- CEST (UTC+2) | | | | Stadium: Stade de la Licorne |

| 3 May 2002 38 | Beauvais | 1–1 | Amiens | Beauvais |
| --:-- CEST (UTC+2) | | | | Stadium: Stade Pierre Brisson |

=== Coupe de la Ligue ===
| 1 September 2001 First round | Amiens | 2–1 | Angers | Amiens |
| --:-- CEST (UTC+2) | | | | Stadium: Stade de la Licorne |

| 1 December 2001 Round of 32 | Amiens | 2–0 | Nîmes | Amiens |
| --:-- CET (UTC+1) | | | | Stadium: Stade de la Licorne |

| 8 January 2002 Round of 16 | Amiens | 0–2 | Strasbourg | Amiens |
| --:-- CET (UTC+1) | | | | Stadium: Stade de la Licorne |

== Statistics ==
=== Squad statistics ===
| No. | Pos | Nat | Player | Total | | Division 2 | | Coupe de France | | Coupe de la Ligue | | | |
| No. | Pos | Nat | Player | Apps | Goals | Apps | Goals | Apps | Goals | Apps | Goals | | |
Goalkeepers
| 1 | GK | (France) FRA | [[]] | 0 | 0 | 0 | 0 | 0 | 0 | 0 | 0 | 0 | 0 |
| 1 | GK | (France) FRA | [[]] | 0 | 0 | 0 | 0 | 0 | 0 | 0 | 0 | 0 | 0 |
Defenders
| 1 | DF | (France) FRA | [[]] | 0 | 0 | 0 | 0 | 0 | 0 | 0 | 0 | 0 | 0 |
| 1 | DF | (France) FRA | [[]] | 0 | 0 | 0 | 0 | 0 | 0 | 0 | 0 | 0 | 0 |
Midfielders
| 1 | MF | (France) FRA | [[]] | 0 | 0 | 0 | 0 | 0 | 0 | 0 | 0 | 0 | 0 |
| 1 | MF | (France) FRA | [[]] | 0 | 0 | 0 | 0 | 0 | 0 | 0 | 0 | 0 | 0 |
Forwards
| 1 | FW | (France) FRA | [[]] | 0 | 0 | 0 | 0 | 0 | 0 | 0 | 0 | 0 | 0 |
| 1 | FW | (France) FRA | [[]] | 0 | 0 | 0 | 0 | 0 | 0 | 0 | 0 | 0 | 0 |
Players who have made an appearance or had a squad number this season but have left the club
| 1 | GK | (France) FRA | [[]] | 0 | 0 | 0 | 0 | 0 | 0 | 0 | 0 | 0 | 0 |

=== Goalscorers ===
| Rank | No. | Pos | Nat | Name | Division 2 | Coupe de France | Coupe de la Ligue | Total | |
|---|---|---|---|---|---|---|---|---|---|
| 1 | 1 | FW | (France) | [[]] | 0 | 0 | 0 | 0 | |
| 2 | 2 | MF | (France) | [[]] | 0 | 0 | 0 | 0 | |
| 2 | Totals | | | | | 0 | 0 | 0 | 0 |
