= David Berthelot =

French footballer (born 1977)

Personal information
- Date of birth: 22 September 1977 (age 48)
- Place of birth: France
- Position: Goalkeeper

Senior career*
Years	Team	Apps	(Gls)
	Red Star	0	(0)
–2002	USL Dunkerque		
2002–2004	CS Louhans-Cuiseaux		
2004–2005	Raith Rovers	40	(0)
2006–2007	Villemomble Sports		
- * Club domestic league appearances and goals

David Berthelot (born 22 September 1977) is a French former professional footballer who played as a goalkeeper.

== Career ==
Berthelot started his senior career with Red Star. In 2004, he signed for Raith Rovers in the Scottish Football League First Division, where he made forty appearances and scored zero goals. After that, he played for French club Villemomble Sports before retiring.
