= Wargnier =

Wargnier is a surname of French origin. Notable people with the surname include:

- Christophe Wargnier (born 1980), French football coach
- Régis Wargnier (born 1948), French filmmaker
