= Lycée Français Charles de Gaulle (Central African Republic) =

French international school in Bangui, CAR

Location
- Avenue NASSER, BP : 1914 RCA
- Coordinates: 4.372260°N 18.579916°E

Information
- Established: 1992
- Website: lfcdg.websco.fr

Lycée Français Charles de Gaulle de Bangui is a French international school in Bangui, Central African Republic. The school serves levels maternelle (preschool) through lycée (senior high school). As of October 2013 there were 182 students. Most students were CAR citizens and several were binationals. A small number included French and other nationalities.

The école française Charles-de-Gaulle and the Lycée Franco-Centrafricain André-Malraux merged on 1 September 1992, forming the Charles de Gaulle. French expatriates operating the school left the capital in 2013 due to the Central African Republic conflict.
