= Achille Rouga =

Beninese footballer

Rachid Rouga
Personal information
- Full name: Abdoul Rachid Rouga
- Date of birth: 10 June 1987 (age 39)
- Place of birth: Parakou, Benin
- Height: 1.78 m (5 ft 10 in)
- Position: Defender

Youth career
- 2002–2008: Rennes

Senior career*
Years	Team	Apps	(Gls)
2008–2009	F.C. Flers	21	(0)
2009–2010	Unitas '30	26	(0)
2010–2011	Avrankou Omnisport FC		(0)
2011	Basingstoke Town	0	(0)
2012	Waltham Forest	1	(0)

International career
2008	Benin	5	(0)
- * Club domestic league appearances and goals

Abdoul Rachid Achille Rouga (born 10 June 1987) is a Beninese former professional footballer who played as a defender. A Rennes youth product, he played for lower-league teams in France, the Netherlands, and England and spent one season with Benin Premier League side with Avrankou Omnisport FC. In 2008, he made one appearance for the Benin national team.

== Club career ==
Rouga was born in Parakou, Benin. He was on the books of Rennes, but never played a senior match. He left Rennes in summer 2008 to join F.C. Flers. He left F.C. Flers after one year for Dutch club for Unitas '30 from Etten-Leur. In summer 2010 he returned to Benin where he signed with Avrankou Omnisport FC. In summer 2011 he returned to Europe, with English-based Basingstoke Town. After one game for Basingstoke he left the club in December 2011 to join Isthmian League Division One North side Waltham Forest. After the end of the 2012 season he was released by Waltham Forest and in December 2012 signed with the Non-League club UK Football Finder Football Club of the Spartan South Midlands League.

== International career ==
Rouga earned his first reputation with the Benin national team squad during the 2008 Africa Cup of Nations, where he was a last minute inclusion to the roster. His selection was a shock to his French club who did not even know he had gone on a pre-tournament tour to Brazil. He held five caps; his first game was on 19 November 2008 against Egypt.
