= Bangui =

Capital and largest city of the Central African Republic

Bangui Bangî
- Capital city
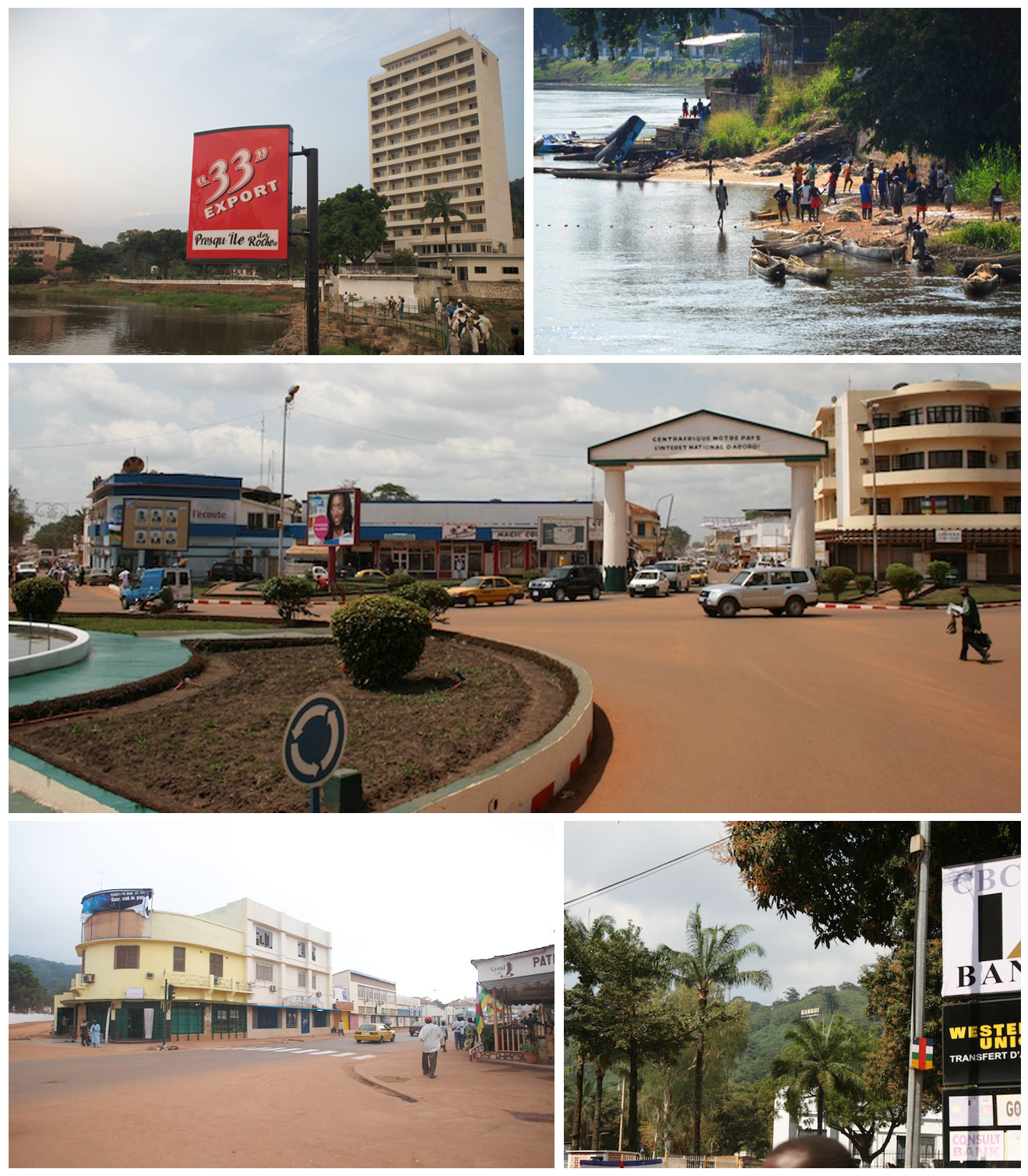
- From left to right, top to bottom: Oubangui Hotel; Shores of Bangui; Bangui Shopping District; Pedestrian crossing; View of a street

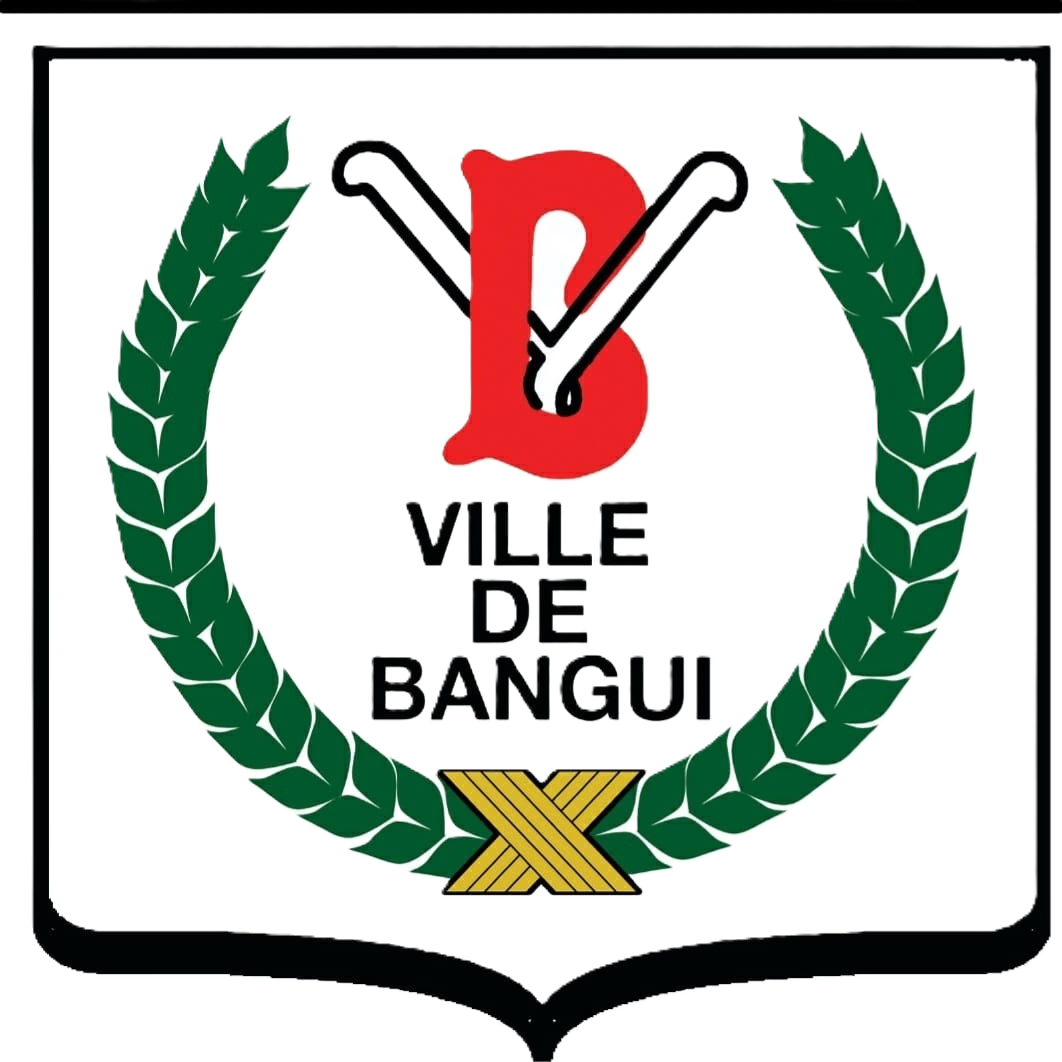
- Seal

- Bangui

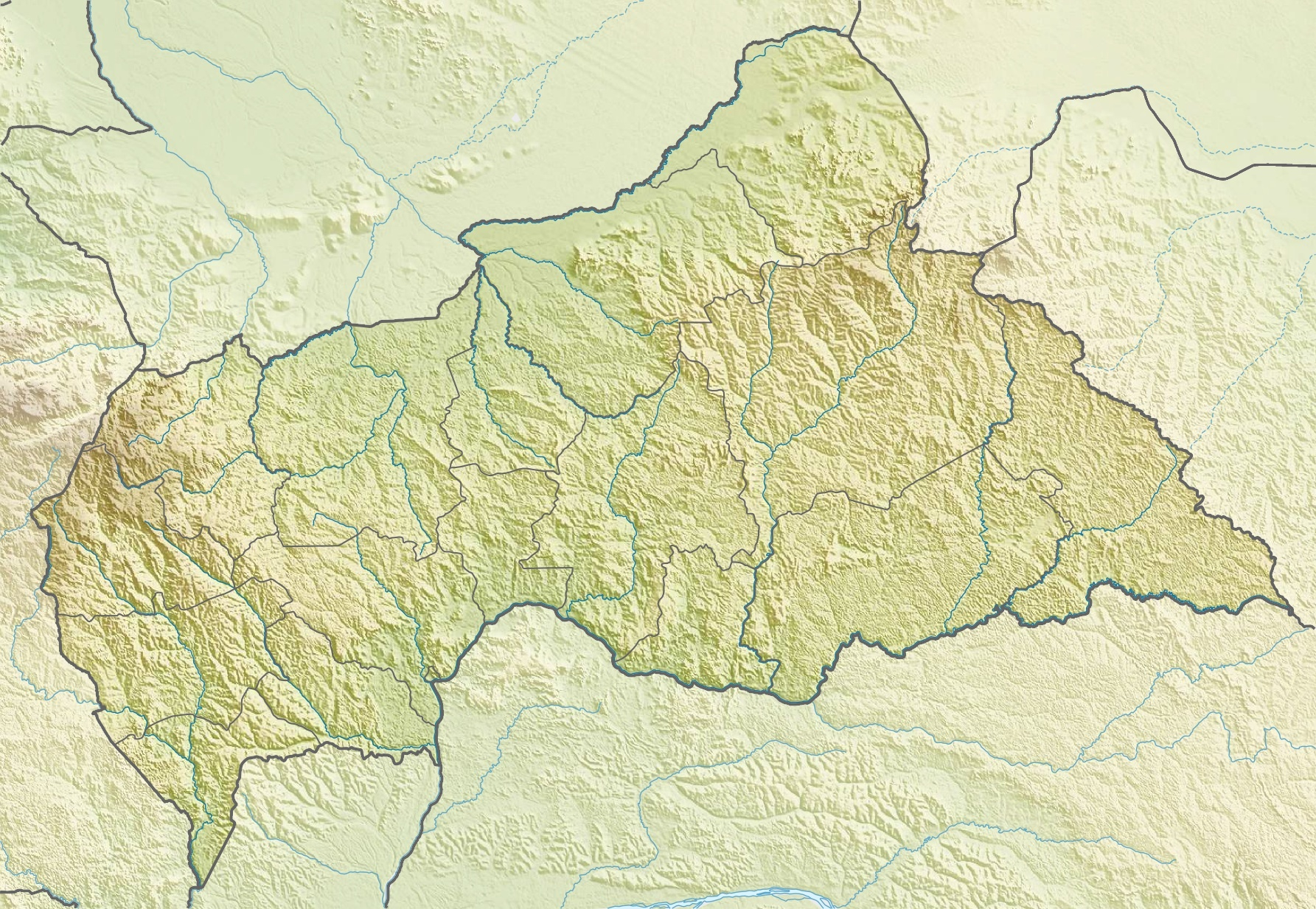
- Location within Central African Republic Location within Africa
- Coordinates: 04°22′24″N 18°33′46″E
- Country: Central African Republic
- Prefecture: Bangui
- Founded: 26 June 1889

Government
  - Mayor: Émile Gros Raymond Nakombo (2016–present)

Area
  - Total: 67 km^{2} (26 sq mi)
- Elevation: 369 m (1,211 ft)

Population (2021)
  - Total: 812,407
  - Density: 12,000/km^{2} (31,000/sq mi)
- Time zone: UTC+01:00 (WAT)
- HDI (2023): 0.552 medium · 1st

Bangui (French pronunciation: [bɑ̃ɡi]; or Bangî in Sango, formerly written Bangi in English) is the capital and largest city of the Central African Republic. It was established as a French outpost in 1889 and named after its location on the northern bank of the Ubangi River (French: Oubangui); the Ubangi itself was named from the Bobangi word for the "rapids" located beside the settlement, which marked the end of navigable water north from Brazzaville. The majority of the population of the Central African Republic lives in the western parts of the country, in Bangui and the surrounding area.

The city has been part of Bangui Prefecture since December 2020. As of 2020 it had an estimated population of 889,231.

The city consists of eight urban districts (arrondissements), 16 groups (groupements) and 205 neighbourhoods (quartiers). As the capital of the Central African Republic, Bangui acts as an administrative, trade, and commercial centre. The National Assembly, government buildings, banks, foreign enterprises and embassies, hospitals, hotels, main markets and the Ngaragba Central Prison are all located here. Bangui manufactures textiles, food products, beer, shoes and soap. Its Notre-Dame Cathedral is the seat of the Roman Catholic Archdiocese of Bangui. The city is also home to the University of Bangui, inaugurated in 1970. It is served by the Bangui M'Poko International Airport.

== History ==
Archaeological studies in and around Bangui have yielded at least 26 ancient Iron Age sites that contain many metallurgical tools and objects, illuminating the pre-European history of the city and surrounding area. The archaeological sites were added to the UNESCO World Heritage Tentative List on 11 April 2006 in the Cultural category. The site closest to Bangui is Pendere-Sengue, 800 metres (2,600 ft) from Independence Avenue, where archaeologists and conservation agencies have carried out studies. It is a paleo-metallurgical site where several thousand shards of ceramics, iron tools, pottery, and an iron spatula weighing 9 kilograms (20 lb) have been unearthed. Its dating, compared with similar sites in Nigeria and Sudan, could be close to the ninth century BC.

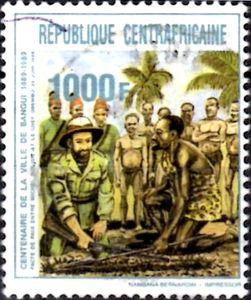
Dolisie and Chief Gbembo sign a pact in 1889 leading to Bangui's founding (commemorated on a 1989 stamp)

The modern settlement of Bangui was founded by Michel Dolisie and Alfred Uzac on 26 June 1889 on the direction of Brazzaville administrator Albert Dolisie. It was located in what was then the upper reaches of the French Congo, the present-day Congo. The original site was 10 km (6.2 mi) south of the Ubangi rapids. Its territory was organized first into the territory of the Upper Ubangi (Haut-Oubangui) and then as the separate colony of Ubangi-Shari. The initial capitals of these areas were at les Abiras and Fort de Possel further upstream, but the rapids at Bangui blocked them from direct communication along the river and caused the settlement there to grow in importance until, in 1906, it was chosen as the new headquarters for the French administration. Bangui retained its importance as a military and administrative centre when the colony was folded into French Equatorial Africa and under both Vichy and Free French control during World War II. The French operated a radio transmitter in Bangui, which was described in 1932 as "the most remote radio station in Africa".

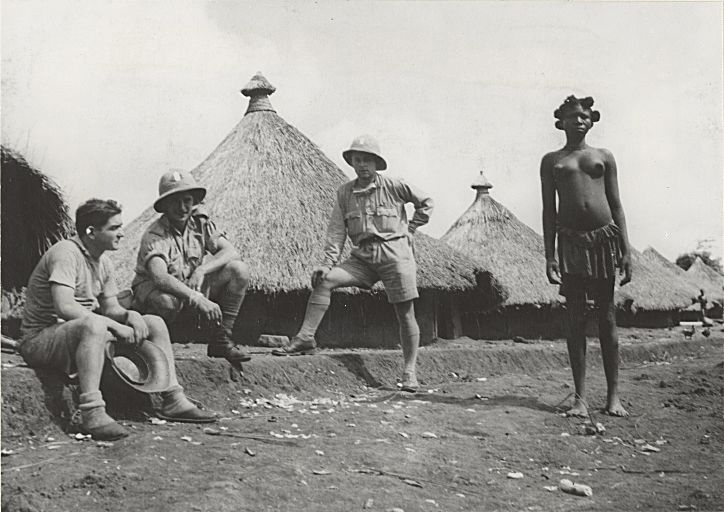
A local woman together with Free French soldiers near Bangui in 1940

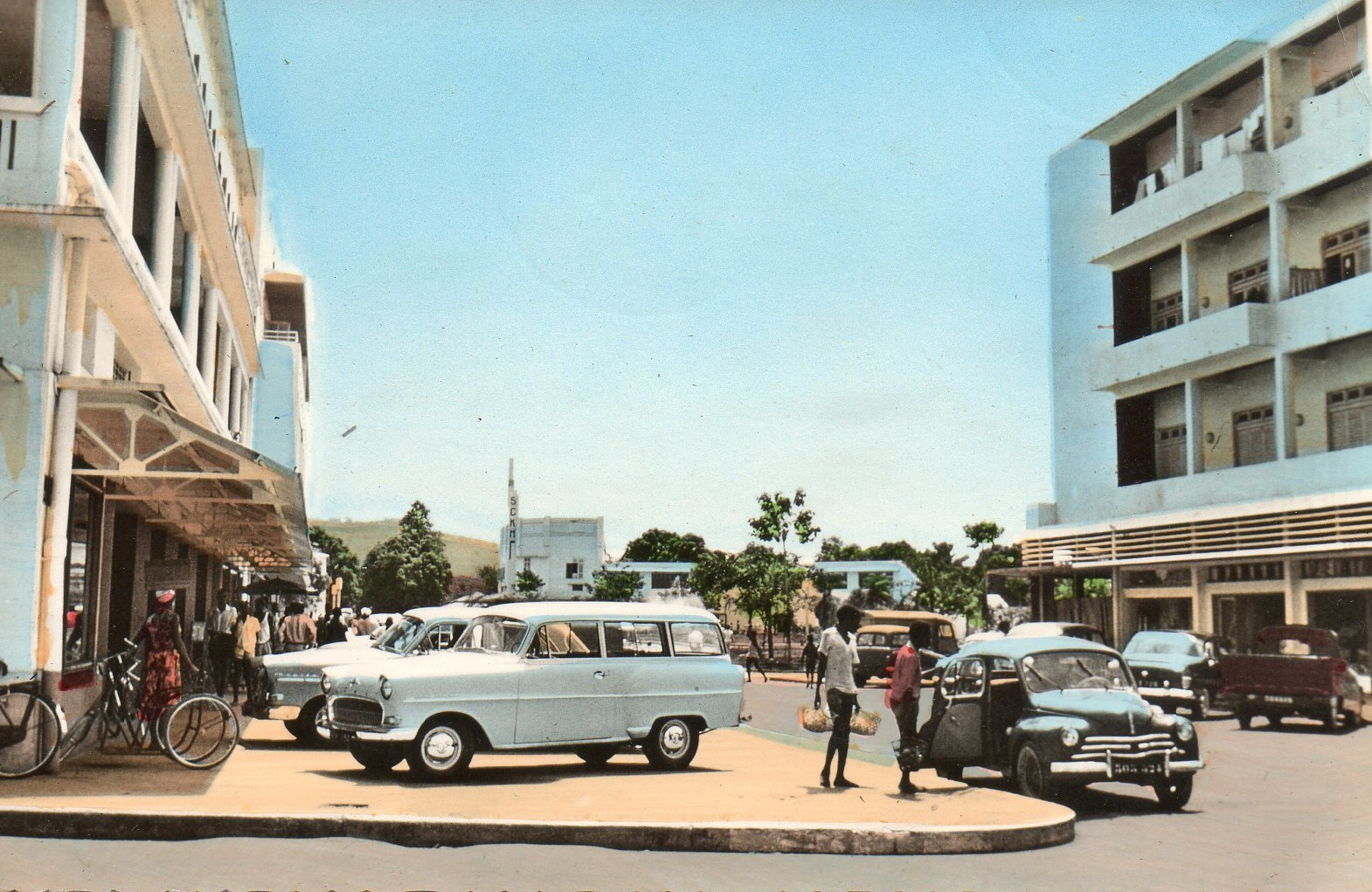
Bangui in 1960

The colony of Ubangi-Shari received its autonomy in 1958 as the Central African Republic and became independent from France in 1960. In 1970, President Jean-Bédel Bokassa inaugurated the University of Bangui. He established the national airline Air Centrafrique the following year and ordered the construction of two new luxury hotels in Bangui. With tensions mounting between Bangui and Paris as a result of Bokassa's uncontrollable expenditures, western banks refused to lend him any more money. Relations with the French worsened still further in April 1974, when the body of Brigette Miroux was discovered in a hotel room in Bangui. Miroux was a native of northern France who in 1973 came to the Central African Republic to become a "hostess" in Bokassa's Caravelle aircraft. It was reported in the French media that she had been Bokassa's mistress and that he was responsible for her murder. As a result, Bokassa banned import of French newspapers and assumed control of the Agence France-Presse office in Bangui. By 1975, Bangui had a population of 300,723.

In March 1981, widespread violence took place in Bangui following elections, after Operation Caban led the French to drop Bokassa (who had begun to call himself Emperor Bokassa I) and to replace him with David Dacko. Opponents of the President met in Bangui and were forced to flee the country. After returning voluntarily to Bangui in the autumn of 1986, Bokassa went on trial. Initially faced with the death penalty, in February 1988 he was instead sentenced to life imprisonment. His successor was General André Kolingba, army chief of staff of Dacko's army, who took over control from the local French military on 1 September 1981 under the pretext that the country was heading towards civil war. Although he attempted to combat corruption and control the national economy, he was unable to achieve his reforms. By the middle of the 1980s the country's economic situation had deteriorated as 80% of the revenue went towards meeting the salaries of the staff. Under pressure from a donor group called GIBAFOR (France, USA, Japan, Germany, EU, World Bank and the UN) Kolingba made moves to restore a degree of democracy in the country in 1991 with a multiparty government. Elections were held in 1993 and 1994. The first round was sabotaged by the government when it was clear they would lose. Under continued donor pressure elections were held again in 1994 as before with help from the UN Electoral Assistance Division. During these elections, Ange-Félix Patassé was elected to the post of president. Since he was from northern CAR, the southern group of Kolingba started a rebellion during 1996.

In May 1996, about 200 soldiers of the Central African Republic mutinied in Bangui, demanding salary increases and the abdication of Ange-Félix Patassé. In the aftermath, the renegades plundered and killed more than 50 people. Following this, the French troops stationed in the country suppressed the rebellion and restored the dictatorial power. After being elected, President Patassé announced a national unity government in early 1997. The Patassé government, the opposition parties, and religious groups signed the Bangui Agreements in January 1997 which were a series of measures designed to reconcile competing political factions, reform and strengthen the economy. The same year, the rebel troops refused a military base in Bangui and in June a new revolt broke out.

In view of frequent political unrest the city was named in 1996 as one of the most dangerous cities in the world. On 25 October 2002, several towns in the country and later Bangui itself were attacked by the forces of General François Bozizé, backed with international support. Bozizé refused to accept an arrest warrant and "defected with about a hundred troops, engaged in street battles in the northern neighborhoods of Bangui (traditionally supporting Patassé)" and went north. Bozizé went into exile in Chad but his troops returned to Bangui and fighting continued. Peace-keeping forces were ineffective, leaving Patassé isolated, and with support from Chad, Bozizé's troops were successful in removing Patassé's government. Patassé, who was returning from Niger after attending a conference, was not permitted to land in Bangui and he took asylum in Togo, and Bozizé seized power and suspended the constitution. An all-party National Transitional Government was set up which functioned as an interim legislative body. However, the "climate of distrust continued".

=== 2013 rebellion ===
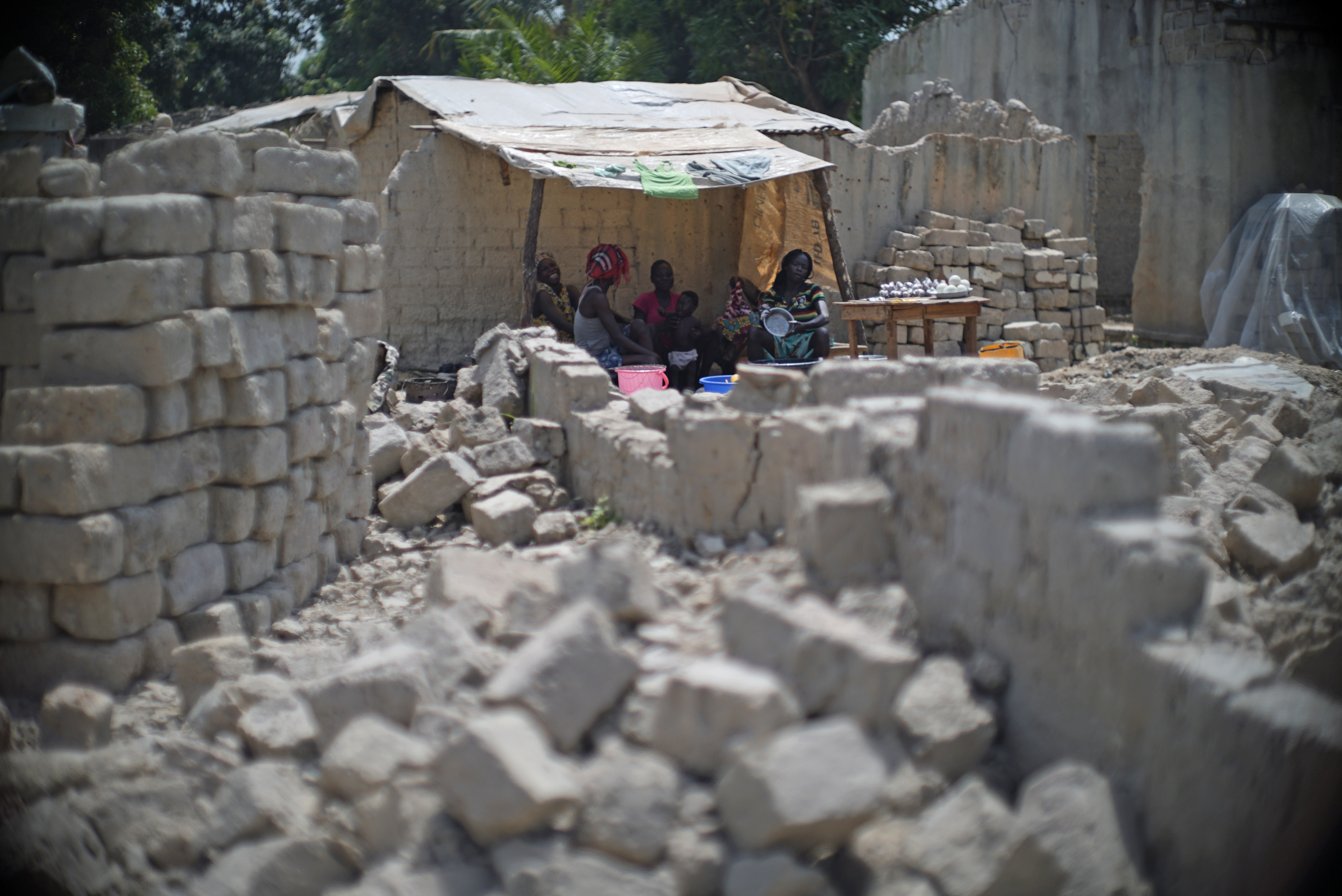
A family shelters from the sun under tarpaulins from a refugee camp with bricks to rebuild their homes around them in the PK5 neighbourhood.

In late 2012, the Séléka coalition rebelled against the autocratic rule of François Bozizé and entered the city. After capturing Bria, Sibut, and other important towns, they were on the verge of capturing Damara, the last strategic town before Bangui. France and the US refused to support the president and neighbouring countries reinforced the Central African Multinational Force (Fomac).

In January 2013, the rebels terminated their operations, hoping for a negotiated settlement. Following a ceasefire and a power-sharing agreement, Séléka and Bozizé agreed to honour the rebel's demands for the release of rebel prisoners and the expulsion of foreign troops from the country. The agreement allowed Bozizé to complete his term in office and to include members of Séléka in a new government. It was also agreed that fresh elections would be held in 2016. The agreement was not honoured and the rebels captured Bangui on 23 March 2013, forcing Bozizé to flee the capital.

As of early January 2014, "around 500,000 have fled their homes" in Bangui, "almost half the city's population."

On 13 January 2021 around 200 rebels attacked Bangui, killing one peacekeeper before being repelled.

== Geography and climate ==
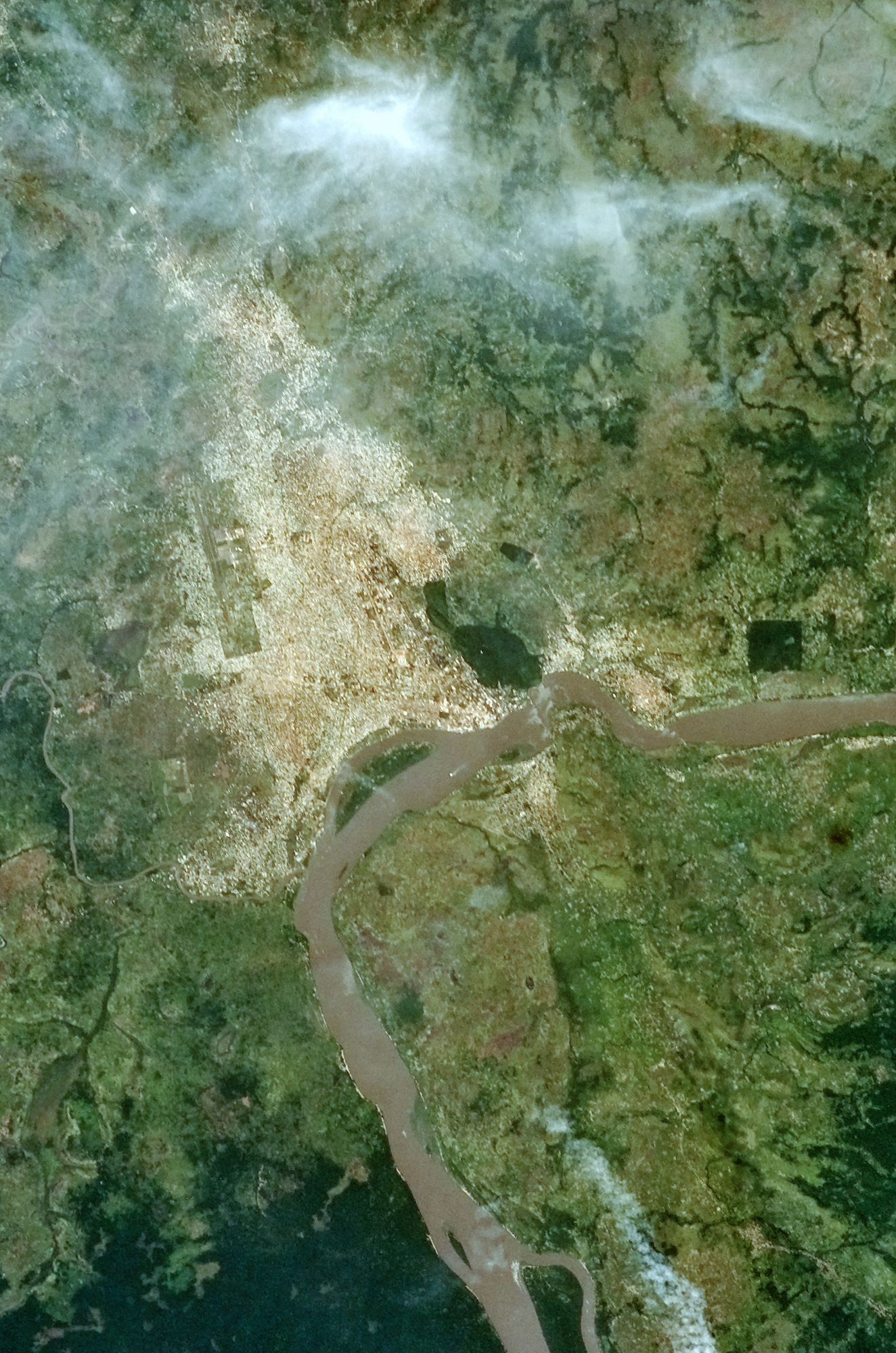
Satellite view of Bangui.

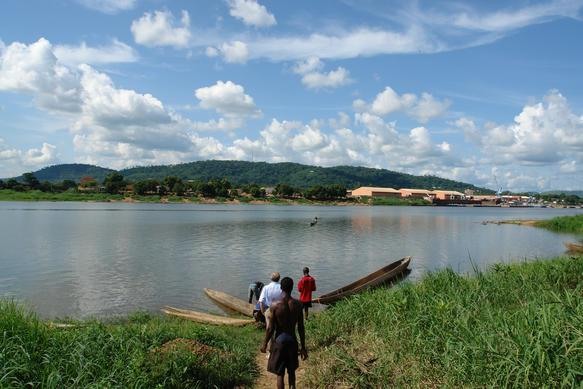
Ubangi (Oubangui) River at the outskirts of Bangui.

Bangui, close to the country's southern border, lies on the northern banks of the Ubangi River just below a series of rapids that limit major commercial shipping upriver. The only major city located on the river, it covers an area of 67 square kilometres (26 sq mi). The navigable Ubangi River, with the backdrop of lush green hills, turns sharply south below Bangui and connects to the Congo River just south of the equator near Brazzaville as its chief northern tributary. The Ubangi river marks the border between the Central African Republic and the Democratic Republic of the Congo. The Congolese town of Zongo is situated across the river from Bangui. The river flows to the east of downtown Bangui. During the rainy season the discharge in the river is three times higher than during the rest of the year. The city was also known as La Coquette (the beautiful city) in the 1970s.

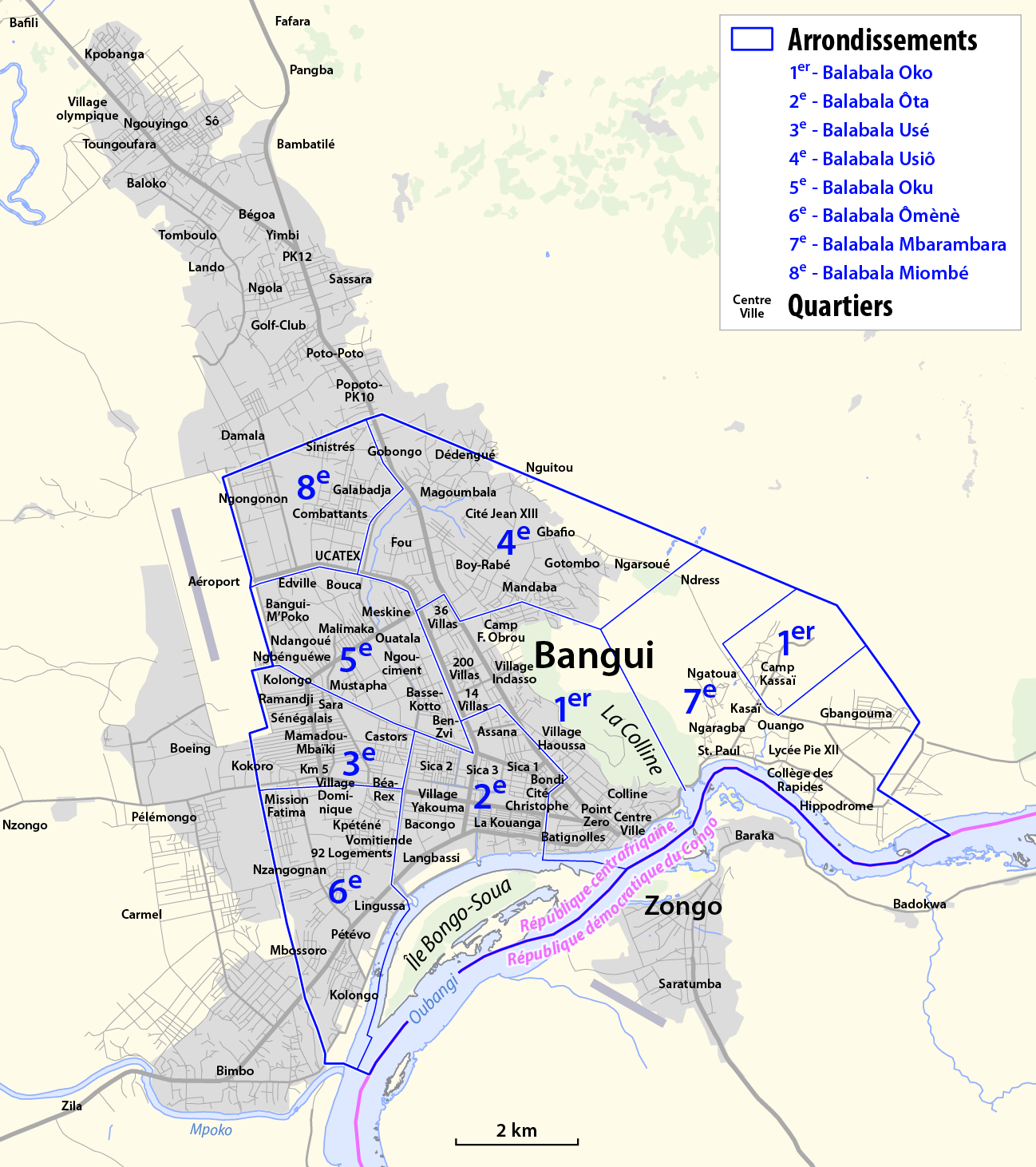
Map of Arrondissements and Quartiers in the area of Bangui

Close to the river, the city centre features a large arch dedicated to Bokassa as well as the presidential palace and the central market. Lying five kilometres (three miles) further north, the heart of the residential area has the largest market and most of the nightlife. Many of those in the suburbs live in houses known as Kodros, built of mud bricks with a thatched roof.

The Bangui Magnetic Anomaly, one of the earth's largest crustal anomalies and the largest in Africa, has its centre in Bangui." It takes the form of a huge ellipse of 700 kilometres (430 mi) x 1,000 kilometres (620 mi), with its central point at 6 degrees north and 18 degrees east. It consists of three parts or segments, which comprise the northern, the southern and the central anomalies. The magnetic equator passes through the feature's centre. Although it is well documented, the feature's origins are not fully understood.

The Central African Republic is situated just north of the Equator with daily temperatures normally reaching at least 30 °C. Bangui, close to the Equator in the south of the country, it is slightly hotter and wetter than the northern regions. It has a tropical savanna climate (Köppen: Aw) with dry winters. While the warm season is from 23 January to 18 March, the cold season lasts from 20 June to 27 August, when rainfall is frequently accompanied by thunderstorms. The city is bordered by thick tropical rainforests along the river banks. Several of its neighbourhoods are in low-lying areas prone to recurrent flooding with severe rains in June and July 2009 leaving 11,000 people homeless.

Climate data for Bangui (Bangui M'poko International Airport) 1991–2020, extremes 1982-present
Month	Jan	Feb	Mar	Apr	May	Jun	Jul	Aug	Sep	Oct	Nov	Dec	Year
Record high °C (°F)	38.6 (101.5)	40.4 (104.7)	40.2 (104.4)	39.5 (103.1)	39.5 (103.1)	36.2 (97.2)	35.4 (95.7)	35.6 (96.1)	37.0 (98.6)	37.0 (98.6)	37.5 (99.5)	37.9 (100.2)	40.4 (104.7)
Mean daily maximum °C (°F)	33.8 (92.8)	35.1 (95.2)	34.7 (94.5)	33.3 (91.9)	32.4 (90.3)	31.1 (88.0)	30.4 (86.7)	30.5 (86.9)	31.3 (88.3)	31.2 (88.2)	32.1 (89.8)	32.9 (91.2)	32.4 (90.3)
Daily mean °C (°F)	25.2 (77.4)	26.9 (80.4)	27.6 (81.7)	27.1 (80.8)	26.4 (79.5)	25.5 (77.9)	25.0 (77.0)	25.1 (77.2)	25.1 (77.2)	25.0 (77.0)	25.4 (77.7)	25.2 (77.4)	25.8 (78.4)
Mean daily minimum °C (°F)	18.2 (64.8)	20.8 (69.4)	22.6 (72.7)	22.5 (72.5)	22.1 (71.8)	21.6 (70.9)	21.3 (70.3)	21.3 (70.3)	21.2 (70.2)	21.2 (70.2)	20.9 (69.6)	19.1 (66.4)	21.1 (70.0)
Record low °C (°F)	11.8 (53.2)	12.5 (54.5)	16.0 (60.8)	19.5 (67.1)	19.8 (67.6)	19.0 (66.2)	18.5 (65.3)	18.0 (64.4)	18.5 (65.3)	17.0 (62.6)	13.7 (56.7)	12.6 (54.7)	11.8 (53.2)
Average precipitation mm (inches)	11.1 (0.44)	43.3 (1.70)	98.3 (3.87)	117.6 (4.63)	151.7 (5.97)	160.8 (6.33)	196.8 (7.75)	218.3 (8.59)	175.7 (6.92)	198.4 (7.81)	68.5 (2.70)	18.0 (0.71)	1,458.4 (57.42)
Average precipitation days (≥ 1.0 mm)	1	3	7	8	9	10	12	12	11	12	7	2	94
Average relative humidity (%) (daily average)	62.8	62.1	67.9	73.3	76.2	78.2	80.0	79.8	78.3	78.5	74.7	68.4	73.4
Mean monthly sunshine hours	221	208	207	195	191	184	162	160	161	167	198	237	2,291
Source: NOAA

== Administration ==
Bangui is an autonomous commune (commune autonome) of the Central African Republic. With an area of 67 square kilometres (26 sq mi), it is by far the country's smallest high-level administrative division in area but the highest in population as of 2003. The city of Bangui consists of eight urban districts (arrondissements), 16 groups (groupements) and 205 neighbourhoods (quartiers).

The International Criminal Court opened a field office in Bangui in October 2007. The National Assembly of CAR, a multiparty republic, with its headquarters in Bangui, is a unitary legislative body with 105 members.

The country's ministries, Civil Services, Labour and Social Security; Communication, National Reconciliation and Democratic and Civic Culture; Economy, Finance, the Budget, Planning and International Co-operation; Equipment and Transport; Foreign and Francophone Affairs, and Regional Integration; Justice, Human Rights and Good Governance; and Mines, Energy and Hydraulics, are all based in Bangui.

== Demographics ==
Historical population
Year	Pop.	±%
1950	42,000	—
1951	47,000	+11.9%
1960	94,000	+100.0%
1970	204,000	+117.0%
1975	279,800	+37.2%
1988	427,435	+52.8%
1994	524,000	+22.6%
2001	652,000	+24.4%
2020	889,000	+36.3%
2021	910,000	+2.4%
2022	933,000	+2.5%

After the Central African Republic attained independence in 1960, developmental activities began, and the urbanization of Bangui ensued. This is evidenced by the population growth from 279,800 in 1975 to 427,435 in 1988 to 524,000 by 1994, and to 652,000 in 2001. Apart from the ethnic people of the country, the city is also home for a minority group of Greek, Portuguese and Yemeni traders, and also has a small community of French people. The Bangui resident community includes diamond traders from western Africa and Chad, traders from many African countries, and refugees from the Democratic Republic of the Congo and Nigeria.

The official languages of the country are French and Sango; the latter (originally a language from the Ubangi River region) is spoken by 90% of the population. Some of the other languages spoken are Baya (Gbaya), Banda, Ngbaka, Sara, Mbum, Kare, and Mandjia. Sango was simplified by Christian missionaries and is widely used to this day.

== Economy ==
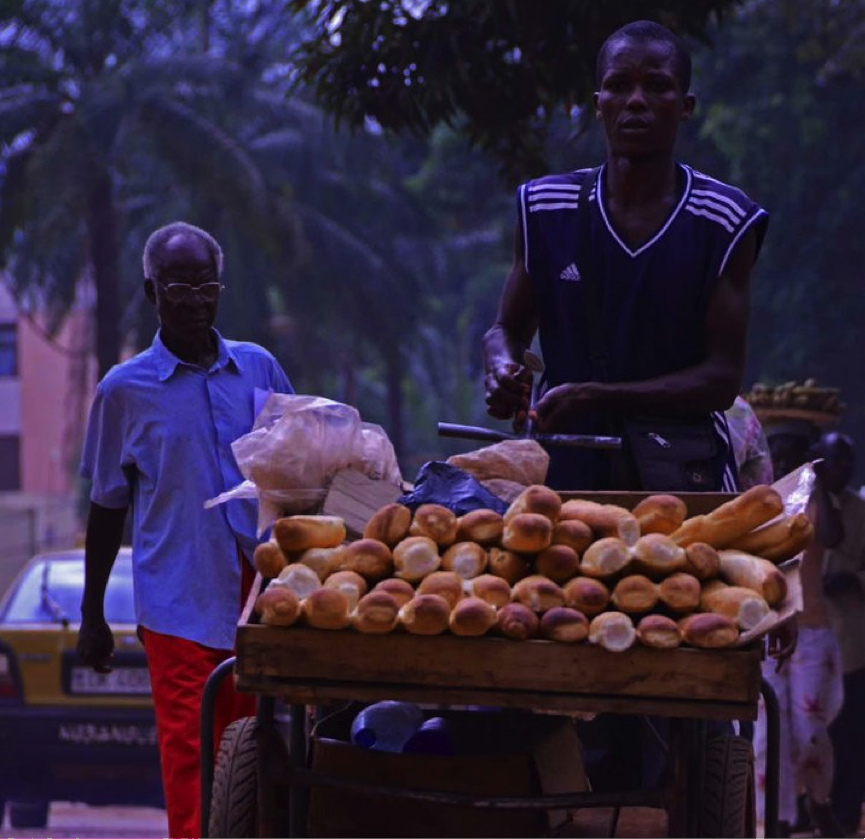
Local traders

Bangui serves as an administrative, trade, and commercial centre. During the Second World War the country became wealthier as exports of rubber, cotton, coffee, uranium and diamonds increased. After the war, the employment of local people in mainstream administration led to the development of the country's infrastructure, which increased trade while slowing the national movement for independence.

During David Dacko's presidency from 1960 to 1966, there was a significant increase in the production of diamonds. This occurred when the monopoly of the French concessionary companies was ended with a law allowing local citizens to dig for diamonds. After Dacko set up a diamond cutting factory at Bangui, diamonds became the country's leading export. But by the end of his five-year tenure, rampant corruption and financial indiscipline had resulted in workers being left unpaid and civil unrest ensued. Bokassa then seized power in a military coup in 1966. Concurrently, Bangui also became the key centre for social and cultural activity in the region, when new institutions were established in the city. However, political turmoil in the country, rampant corruption, and the dictatorial rule of President Bokassa centred in the city, brought in economic recession in the 1970s exacerbated by a fall in international prices for its major exports. This caused impoverishment of the people and severe conflict, further compounded by refugees migrating from troubled neighbouring countries.

Bangui received its first bank in 1946 when a branch of the Paris-based Banque de l'Afrique Occidentale was established there. Arab sellers dominated the city, and it was historically an important centre for ivory trading. Bangui manufactures include textiles, food products, beer, shoes, and soap. The main exports are cotton, rubber, timber, coffee, and sisal. Because of the ongoing strife, unemployment hovered near 23% in the city as of 2001. Ngaragba Central Prison, the national prison for men, is located in Bangui. As of 2007, it had 476 inmates; prison conditions are reported to be poor.

== Landmarks ==
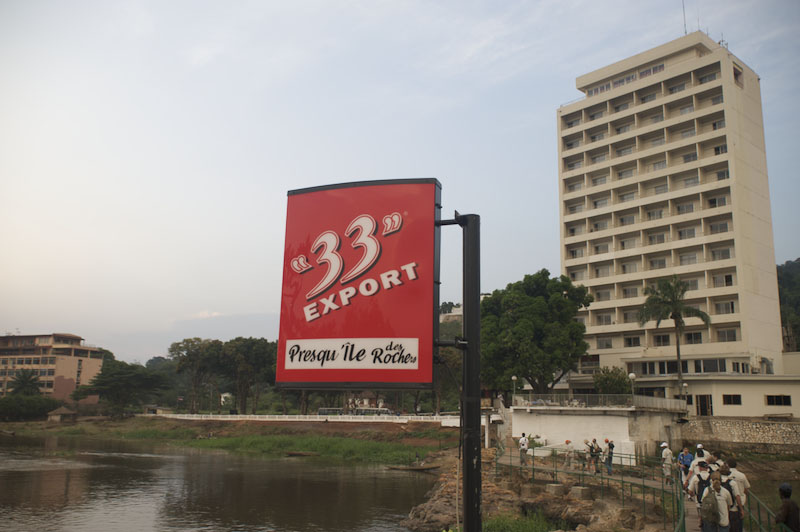
Oubangui Hotel

The old town of Bangui has retained its colonial town planning, with wide boulevards leading towards a central market square. Attractions in Bangui include Boganda Museum, Bangui Zoo, and the Presidential Palace, formerly the Bokassa Palace. Notre-Dame Cathedral is the seat of the Roman Catholic Archdiocese of Bangui. Boganda Museum (Musée de Boganda) has displays of traditional musical instruments, weapons, rural architectural features, ancient hunting tools, pottery, and also many religious antiques. It has a collection of bark cloth, the material used to cover Bokassa's bed.

There are several hotels up to international standards. The Ledger Plaza Bangui on the outskirts has an outdoor swimming pool, tennis court, and comfortable amenities. The National Hotel was established in 1970 with 30 rooms. Also of note are the Golf Palace Hotel, the Hotel du Centre with 72 rooms, JM Residence, the Oubangui Hotel, established in 1985, and Hotel Somba with 23 rooms.

== Culture ==
=== Customs ===
Polygamy is an accepted practice among men.

When someone dies in Bangui a representative from his or her village attends the funeral. "This person is charged with indicating to the deceased the way back home so that the deceased may avenge himself and herself and demonstrate the power of the family". The representative who attends the funeral also carries a little dust from the grave to the village, and gives it to the village's medicine man so that he can ascertain the reasons for his death.

Most of the holidays in Bangui are festivals related to the Christian and Muslim faiths and are the same as those observed in other parts of the world. National holidays include Independence Day and the birthdays of Boganda and several other national heroes.

=== Cuisine ===
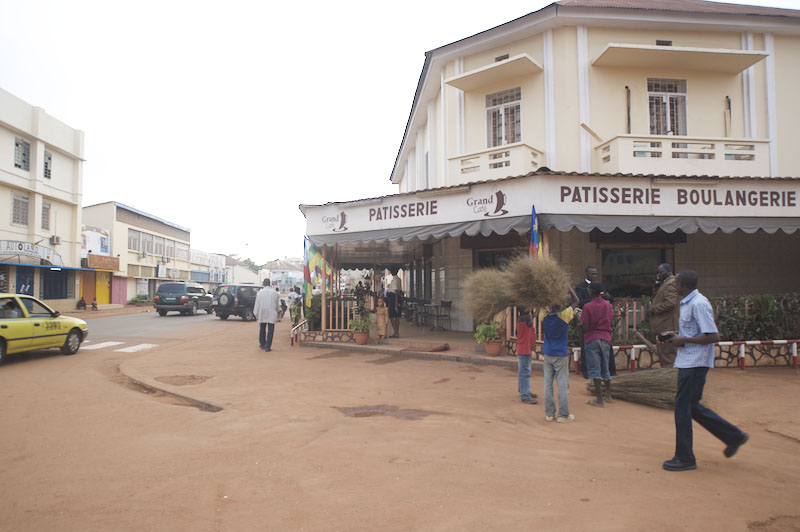
A French boulangerie in Bangui.

The cuisine of CAR is referred to as Centrafrican and the staple diet in Bangui includes cassava, rice, squash, pumpkins and plantains served with a sauce and grilled meat. Okra or gombo is a popular vegetable. Peanuts and peanut butter are widely used. Game is popular, as are the fish-based dishes maboké and soussou. Manioc flour is used for preparing fufu.

Alcoholic beverages served are locally brewed beer, palm wine and banana wine. Non-alcoholic beverages include ginger beer.

=== Art ===
Bangui's artisans' market has traditional wares representing the art products from different regions of the country. Handicrafts include woven mats and baskets, wooden utensils of simple design, carved stools, pottery, musical instruments, tanned skins, and wood products. The balafon, similar to a xylophone, is made out of the horns of animals. Innovative designs include butterfly wings stuck with gum on paper, and ebony and hardwood carvings of wood from the tropical region. Artwork also covers carved animals and human figures. The crafts center in Bangui provides training to about 100 students in artistic crafting in leather, ivory and ebony wares.

=== Music ===
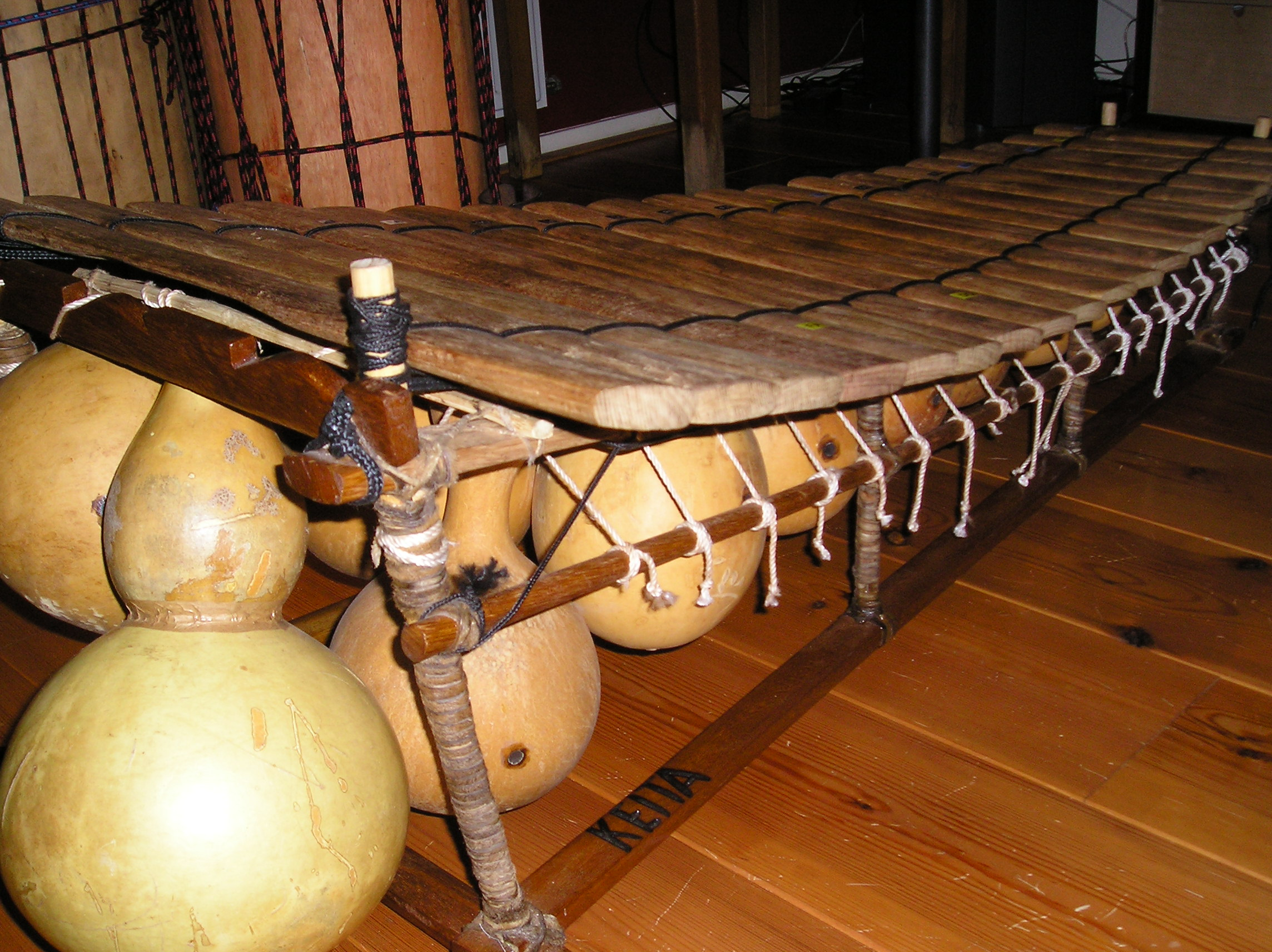
The balafon.

Bangui has a rich music tradition and showcases the country's music. Its musicians also perform in many countries abroad. The Bangui band groups were influenced by Zokela in the 1980s. The innovative music is based on dance bands who have adopted the Congolese music with electronic support. The music is rhythmic and blends with the Congolese rumba, which was influenced by son cubano, cha-cha-cha, and merengue. Popular Central African music groups or dance bands who perform in the city are Musiki, Zokela, Makembe, Cool Stars, Cannon Stars, and Super Stars. Bokassa, during his tenure as president, established a music recording studio in Bangui and employed musicians to sing his praise with songs extolling his qualities as an emperor and to develop his cult image among his people.

=== Sports ===
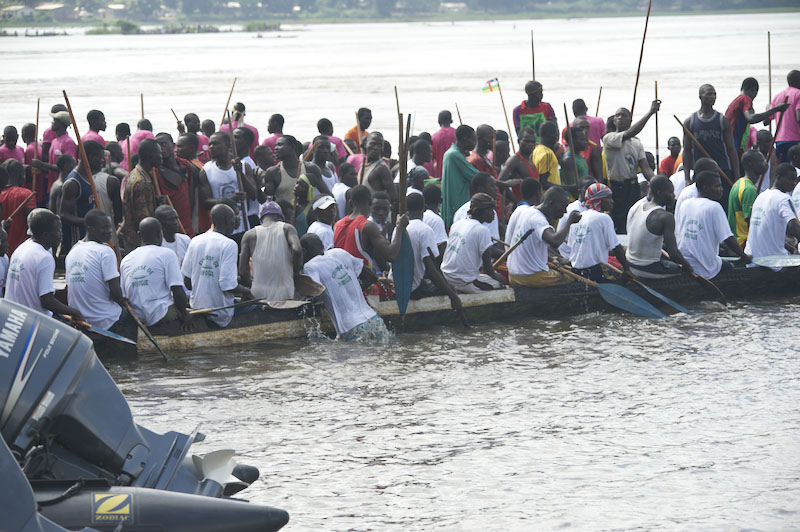
The boat race on the Ubangi River in Bangui.

The most popular sport is basketball. Bangui hosted the FIBA Africa Championship 1974, where the Central African Republic's national basketball team won one of its two continental titles. Football (soccer) is also popular. Both men and women from Bangui and throughout the country have participated in the Olympic Games since 1968 as well as in many international events. The locals also organize boat races with hundreds of participants on the Ubangi River, which is a significant attraction.

== Education ==
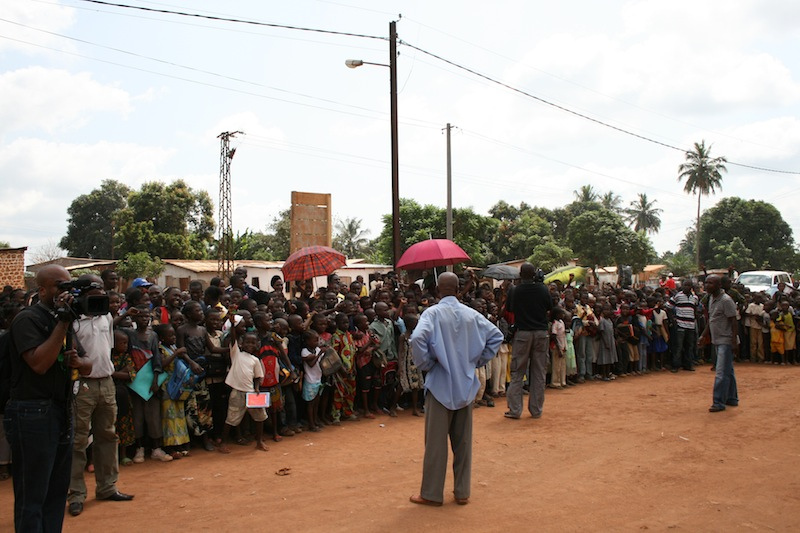
People at a Bangui local school.

The French system of education is the norm and French is the language of teaching, although the Sango language is promoted in schools. A substantial percentage of the population is literate. Schooling is compulsory for children ages 6 to 14.

Bangui is home to the University of Bangui, founded in 1969 by President Jean-Bédel Bokassa who named it after himself; it started operating in 1970. A public institution, the university provides non-agricultural education in the Central African Republic. Since 1981, the University Library has been in a separate building that houses its science, literature, and law collections. The medical school of the university has its own library.

The other educational institutions are the National School of Arts and the Central School of Agriculture, in addition to many religious and technical schools.

A school in the eastern part of the city, Lycée Charles de Gaulle, was established by the French and is named after President of France Charles de Gaulle. Several notable Africans, including writers such as Calixthe Beyala, have studied in the city. Beyala studied at the Lycée des Rapides.

== Places of worship ==
Among the places of worship, they are predominantly Christian churches and temples: Roman Catholic Archdiocese of Bangui (Catholic Church), Evangelical Lutheran Church of the Central African Republic (Lutheran World Federation), Evangelical Baptist Church of the Central African Republic (Baptist World Alliance). There are also Muslim mosques.

== Transport ==
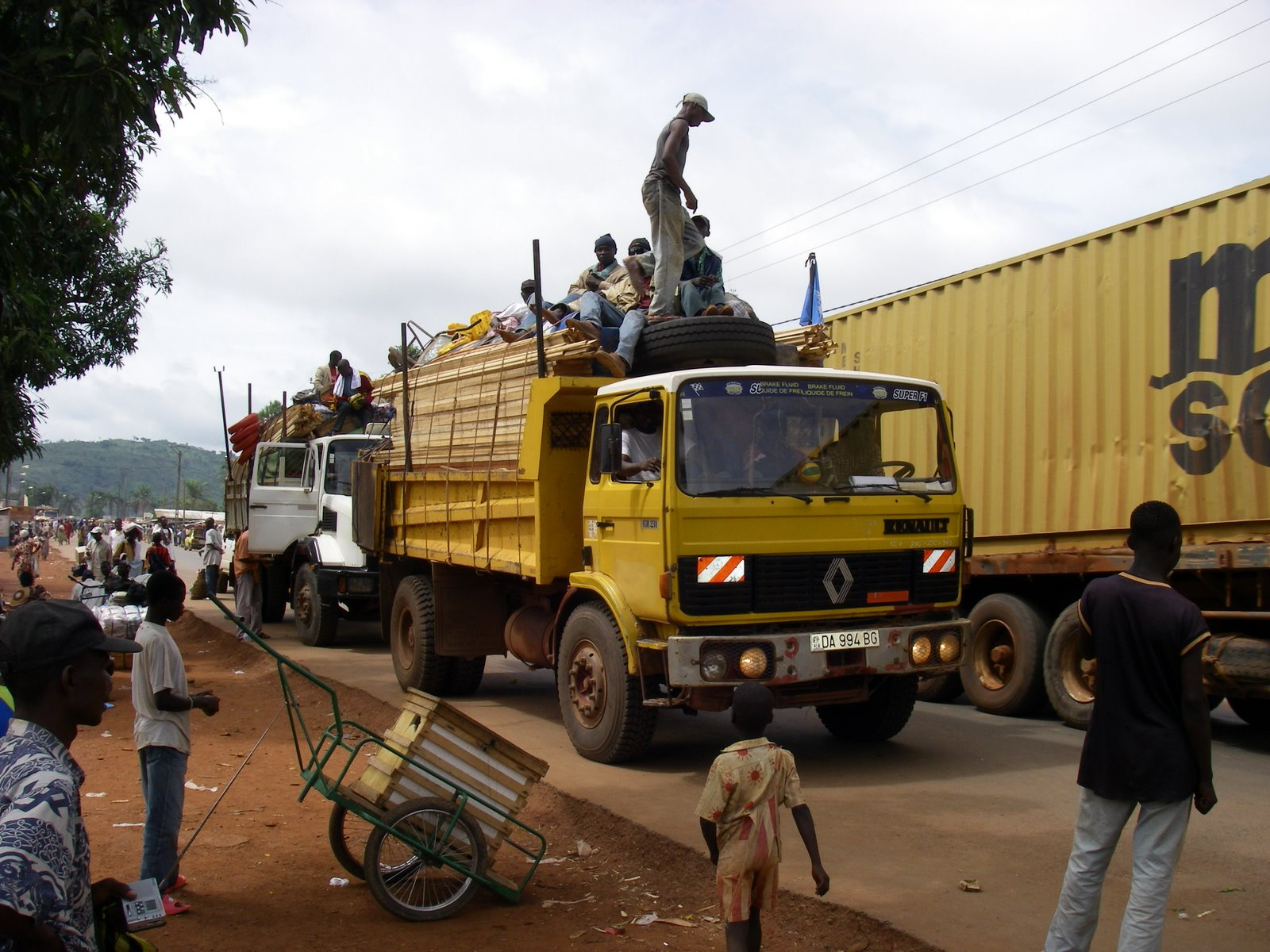
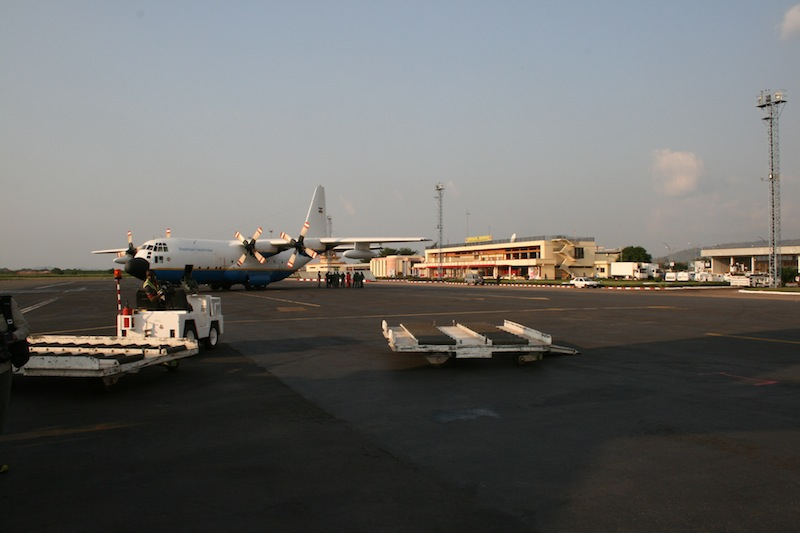
(left) Transportation trucks in Bangui; (right) Bangui airport

Bangui is the transport hub of the Central African Republic. As of 1999, eight roads connected the city to other main towns in the country, Cameroon, Chad and South Sudan; of these, only the toll roads are paved. During the rainy season from March to November, some roads are impassable. The road network in the city emanates from the Palace de la Republique.

River ferries sail from the river port at Bangui to Brazzaville and Zongo. The river can be navigated most of the year between Bangui and Brazzaville. From Brazzaville, goods are transported by rail to Pointe-Noire, Congo's Atlantic port. The river port handles the overwhelming majority of the country's international trade and has a cargo handling capacity of 350,000 tons; it has 350 metres (1,150 ft) length of wharfs and 24,000 square metres (260,000 sq ft) of warehousing space.

The first airstrip in Bangui was built between 1920 and 1925. Bangui M'Poko International Airport is located on 600 hectares (1,500 acres) of deforested land 7 kilometres (4 1/2 mi) off the Avenue of Martyrs to the north of the old town, between the Koudoukou Avenue and the University of Bangui.

== Healthcare ==
A general hospital is located in the eastern side of the city. Modern healthcare facilities exist in Bangui (unlike the rest of the country) but are poor, providing only minimal care. Wealthier citizens make use of private clinics. The prevalence of HIV in Bangui is twice the national average. In late 2019, MSF started providing free medical care to HIV patients in the city; in the first year of the project, 1851 patients were admitted for HIV treatment, 558 of whom were newly diagnosed. The risk of catching malaria in Bangui and pygmy camps is also much higher than in the rest of the country.

A conference of public health officials including representatives of the Centers for Disease Control and the World Health Organization was held in Bangui in October 1985. The conference evolved a diagnostic definition of AIDS which came to be known as the Bangui definition for AIDS. The conference defined symptoms of AIDS in Africa as "prolonged fever for a month or more, weight loss of over 10% and prolonged diarrhea". The Bangui definition proved problematic as immune suppression can also be caused by malnutrition.

== Media ==
Several periodicals and three daily newspapers are published in Bangui: E le Songo, the country's first newspaper, began publication in 1982. The other main newspapers are Le Novateur, Le Citoyen and L'Echo de Centrafrique. Most of the country's institutions have offices in Bangui, including French ones such as Électricité de France (EDF).

Radio stations operating in Bangui include Radio Centrafrique, Radio Nehemie, Radio Notre-Dame, Radio Voix de la paix, Radio Ndeke Luka, RFI, Radio Voik de la grace, Radio Linga FM, Africa no.1, and Tropic FM. BBC World Service is the only English broadcasting station that is heard in the city on 90.2 FM, as all other local channels broadcast in either French and/or Sango. For reliable news, the UN runs channel Radio Ndeke Luka is on 100.8 FM.

== Notable people ==
- Élie Doté, politician and prime minister
- Eloge Enza Yamissi, football player
- Manassé Enza-Yamissi, football player
- André Kolingba, president
- Ralph Kottoy - football player
- Anicet Lavodrama, basketball player
- Joachim N'Dayen, archbishop of the Roman Catholic Archdiocese of Bangui
- Nathalie Tauziat, French tennis player
- Romain Sato, basketball player

== Twin towns/Sister cities ==
Bangui is twinned with:

- Dodoma, Tanzania
- Linz, Austria

== See also ==
- Jojo (chimpanzee)
- University of Bangui
- Battle of Bangui (2013)
- Bangui M'poko international airport
- List of cities in the Central African Republic
- Economy of the Central African Republic

== Bibliography ==
- Benavides, David Díaz; Pérez-Ducy, Ellen (1 January 2002). Tourism in the Least Developed Countries (in French). World Tourism Organization. ISBN 978-92-844-0451-3.
- Booth, Graham; McDuell, G. R.; McDuell, Bob; Sears, John (1999). World of Science: 2. Oxford University Press. ISBN 978-0-19-914698-7.
- Courting history: the landmark International Criminal Court's first years. Human Rights Watch. 2008. p. 129. GGKEY:PZJC9QCXFZL.
- Eur (2002). Africa South of the Sahara 2003. Taylor & Francis. ISBN 978-1-85743-131-5.
- Eur (2003). Africa South of the Sahara 2003. Psychology Press. ISBN 978-1-85743-131-5.
- Egyesült, Államok (2007). Country Reports on Human Rights Practices for 2007. Government Printing Office. p. 87. ISBN 9780160813993. GGKEY:5QXCANS2SXR.
- Doeden, Matt (2009). Central African Republic in Pictures. Twenty-First Century Books. p. 16. ISBN 978-1-57505-952-5.
- Europa Publications (2003). Africa and South of the Sahara 2004. Psychology Press. p. 212. ISBN 978-1-85743-183-4.
- Eyoh, Dickson; Zeleza, Paul Tiyambe (30 October 2002). Encyclopedia of Twentieth-Century African History. Routledge. ISBN 978-0-203-98657-8.
- Gailey, Harry A. (1989). History of Africa: From 1945 to present. R.E. Krieger. ISBN 978-0-89464-296-8.
- Gubbins, David; Herrero-Bervera, Emilio Herrero-Bervera (19 July 2007). Encyclopedia of Geomagnetism and Paleomagnetism. Springer. ISBN 978-1-4020-4423-6.
- Haggett, Peter (2002). Encyclopedia of World Geography: West Africa. Marshall Cavendish. ISBN 978-0-7614-7306-0.
- Ham, Anthony (2010). Africa. Lonely Planet. p. 544. ISBN 978-1-74220-308-9.
- Holmberg, Scott D. (2008). Scientific Errors and Controversies in the U. S. HIV/AIDS Epidemic: How They Slowed Advances and Were Resolved. Greenwood Publishing Group. ISBN 978-0-313-34717-7.
- Jenkins, Sharron Kay (24 June 2009). AIDS: Education and Prevention. AuthorHouse. ISBN 978-1-4389-9264-8.
- Kalck, Pierre (2005). Historical Dictionary of the Central African Republic: Third Edition. Scarecrow Press. p. 29. ISBN 978-0-8108-4913-6.
- Law, Diane (18 August 2011). The Secret History of the Great Dictators: Idi Amin and Emperor Bokassa I. Constable & Robinson Limited. ISBN 978-1-78033-337-3.
- McKenna, Amy (2011). The History of Central and Eastern Africa. The Rosen Publishing Group. ISBN 978-1-61530-396-0.
- Mouchet, Jean; Carnevale, Pierre; Manguin, Sylvie (2008). Biodiversity of Malaria in the World: English version completely updated. John Libbey Eurotext. GGKEY:EK02BYUHW98.
- Parekh, Pushpa N.; Jagne, Signa Fatima (1998). Postcolonial African Writers: A Bio-bibliographical Critical Sourcebook. Greenwood Publishing Group. ISBN 978-0-313-29056-5.
- Pritchard-Jones, Siân; Gibbons, Bob (2009). Africa Overland, 5th: 4x4, Motorbike, Bicycle, Truck. Bradt Travel Guides. ISBN 978-1-84162-283-5.
- Publications, Europa (2003). Africa and South of the Sahara 2004. Psychology Press. ISBN 978-1-85743-183-4.
- Riley, Laura; Riley, William (2005). Nature's Strongholds: The World's Greatest Wildlife Reserves. Princeton University Press. ISBN 978-0-691-12219-9.
- Runge, J. (1 December 2007). Dynamics of Forest Ecosystems in Central Africa. During the Holocene: Past – Present – Future: Palaeoecology of Africa, An International Yearbook of Landscape Evolution and Palaeoenvironments. Taylor & Francis US. ISBN 978-0-203-93042-7.
- Shillington, Kevin (2004). Encyclopedia of African History. CRC Press. ISBN 978-1-57958-245-6.
- Titley, Brian (25 March 1997). Dark Age: The Political Odyssey of Emperor Bokassa. McGill-Queen's Press - MQUP. ISBN 978-0-7735-7046-7.
- Villalón, Leonardo A.; VonDoepp, Peter (1 September 2005). The Fate of Africa's Democratic Experiments: Elites and Institutions. Indiana University Press. ISBN 978-0-253-00311-9.
- Wedeworth, Robert (1993). World Encyclopedia of library and information services. American Library Association. ISBN 978-0-8389-0609-5.
- Woodfork, Jacqueline Cassandra (2006). Culture And Customs of the Central African Republic. Greenwood Publishing Group. ISBN 978-0-313-33203-6.
