= Zokela =

Music group

Zokela is a musical group from the Central African Republic, one of the most influential in the country. The group are responsible for a style of African music of the same name which emerged in the early 1980s. The Bangui-based band features electric guitars and drums with the "insistent and vital sound of ceremonies and funeral dances of the Lobaye".
