= List of prefectures of the Central African Republic by Human Development Index =

This is a list of the 16 prefectures of the Central African Republic and the autonomous commune (capital city) of Bangui by Human Development Index as of 2025 with data for the year 2023.

Rank	Prefectures	HDI (2023)
Medium human development
1	Bangui	0.557
Low human development
–	Central African Republic	0.414
2	Southwestern Region (Ombella-M'Poko, Lobaye, Kemo, Nana-Grébizi)	0.412
3	Northeastern Region (Ouaka, Haute-Kotto, Bamingui-Bangoran, Vakaga)	0.397
4	Western Region (Mambéré-Kadéï, Nana-Mambéré, Sangha-Mbaéré)	0.393
5	Northwestern Region (Ouham-Pendé, Ouham)	0.371
6	Southeastern Region (Basse-Kotto, Mbomou, Haut-Mbomou)	0.350

== See also ==
- List of countries by Human Development Index
