= Ledger Plaza Hotel Bangui =

- Interactive map of the Ledger Plaza Hotel Bangui area

General information
- Status: Completed
- Type: Luxury Hotel
- Location: Avenue de l'indépendance 2361, Bangui, Central African Republic
- Coordinates: 4.383619°N 18.567314°E
- Opening: 2012

Other information
- Number of rooms: 156

Website
- ledgerplaza-bangui.com

Ledger Plaza Hotel is a 5-star hotel in Bangui, Central African Republic.

== History ==
François Bozizé, Sylvie Annick Mazoungou, and the Libya Ambassador to CAR inaugurated Ledger Plaza Hotel on 15 September 2012. During the Seleka government, the hotel was occupied by its militia and Michel Djotodia resided in the presidential suite room. In 2014, Ziad Zarzour became the CEO of the hotel and under his leadership, there was financial embezzlement of millions CFA francs. In 2021, the hotel CEO was replaced to Chokri Ben Abdallah. Arem Group acquired Ledger Plaza Hotel from LAICO in March 2022.

== Facilities ==
The hotel has 156 rooms. Apart from that, there are restaurant, coffee lounge bar, swimming pool, gym, tennis court, spa, and banquet hall. Free WIFI is available in the hotel.

== Controversy ==
=== Working condition ===
In 2020, the Central African staff moaned about the poor conditions that they received, such as salaries, no benefits, and the suspension of loans for two years, unlike the expatriate workers who gained higher wages and benefits. Hence, the local staff demanded an increase in wages by up to 50% and regular payment of benefits.
