= Ralph Kottoy =

Central African Republic footballer

Personal information
- Full name: Ralph Kottoy Yapande
- Date of birth: 9 February 1992 (age 34)
- Place of birth: Bangui, Central African Republic
- Height: 1.83 m (6 ft 0 in)
- Position: Midfielder

Team information
- Current team: Flers
- Number: 23

Senior career*
Years	Team	Apps	(Gls)
2010–2012	Paris FC B	8	(2)
2013–2014	Sainte-Geneviève Sports	9	(0)
2014–2015	Visé	6	(2)
2016–2017	Algarve		
2017–2018	Larne	17	(4)
2018	Carrick Rangers	13	(0)
2018	Petrocub Hîncești		
2019	KTP	6	(0)
2019–2022	US Granville	44	(5)
2022–2023	Limonest	21	(4)
2023–	Flers	28	(3)

International career^{‡}
2017–	Central African Republic	5	(0)
- * Club domestic league appearances and goals as of 8 December 2024 ‡ National team caps and goals as of 19:37, 1 May 2020 (UTC)

Ralph Kottoy Yapande (born 9 February 1992) is a Central African professional footballer who plays as a midfielder for French Championnat National 3 club Flers and the Central African Republic national team.

== Club career ==
Born in Bangui, Kottoy spent his early career with Paris Saint-Germain B, Sainte-Geneviève Sports, Visé, Algarve and Larne.

Kottoy was one of three players released by Larne in January 2018 due to "a serious breach of club discipline". Later that month he signed for Carrick Rangers.

By September 2018 he was playing for Petrocub Hîncești in Moldova, and was still playing for them in October 2018.

In February 2019 he signed a one-year contract with Finnish club KTP. On 2 June 2019, it was announced, that his contract had been terminated by mutual consent after playing only 10 games.

In September 2019 he signed for French club US Granville. After three seasons with the club, he signed for FC Limonest Dardilly Saint-Didier in August 2022.

== International career ==
He made his international debut for Central African Republic in 2017.
