= Jojo (chimpanzee) =

African-born chimpanzee (1951-2012)

Jojo was the oldest chimpanzee in Europe. He was born on 28 June 1951 in Bangui, now in Central African Republic, and died on 20 February 2012 in Nancy, within the Animal Space of the Parc de la Pépinière, at the age of 60.

== Biography ==
=== Birth and Arrival in Nancy ===
Jojo was born in a menagerie in what was then French Equatorial Africa (AEF). The menagerie owner, a nephew of a certain Mr. Poubeau, was forced to liquidate it. He then decided to gift two chimpanzees (Jojo and Catherine), a python, and a gazelle to William Jacson, a deputy from Nancy. Mr. Jacson, unable to care for them, donated them to the city of Nancy, which placed them in its zoo of the Pépinière in 1963.

Jojo arrived with Catherine, a female chimpanzee, about whom it was reported in L'Est Républicain that "to pass the time, she smokes cigarette after cigarette... and the smoke doesn't even sting her eyes!" She died the year following her arrival from a respiratory infection.

=== Life at the Pépinière ===
After Catherine died in 1964, Jojo remained alone until the arrival of Mambo and Judith in 1984, with whom he lived until 1995. Judith died in 2003 after ingesting toxic yew berries under suspicious circumstances, similar to the two bears in the same zoo in 2000. In 1998, Victor, a young male imported illegally from Mali and raised as a human by individuals, was taken in by the Pépinière before being sent to a Spanish sanctuary in 2007. Jojo lived alone from then until his death in 2012.

For many years, Jojo was subjected to mistreatment (involuntary?) by some park visitors who gave him wine to drink or cigarettes to smoke. These behaviors, as the article about the monkey Catherine shows were once not frowned upon, are now universally condemned.

=== Death ===
Jojo died from an ulcer during the night of 19 to 20 February 2012. He was then 60 years old, making him the oldest chimpanzee in Europe. His death moved the Nancy population, which had been marked for generations by the presence of the animal. In a statement, the city of Nancy declared that "Jojo was the memory of a certain way of presenting wild animals now abandoned".

Jojo was thus the first and last chimpanzee of the Pépinière.

== Tributes and Legacy ==
=== Emotion and Taxidermy ===
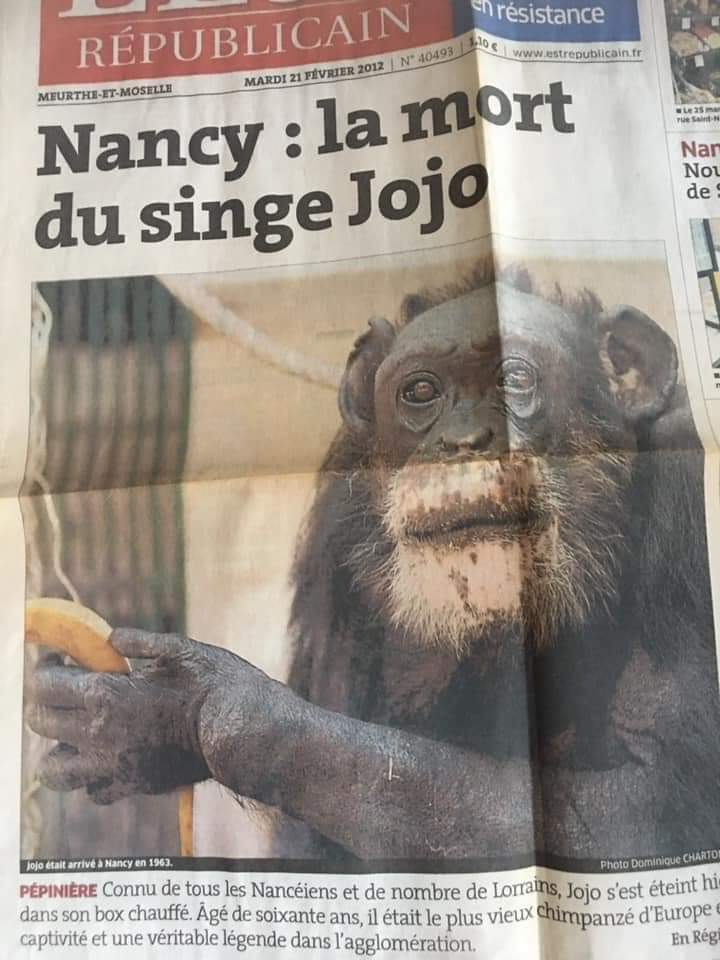
Front page of L'Est Républicain the day after Jojo's death.

L'Est républicain dedicated its front page on 21 February 2012 to Jojo, highlighting the importance of the animal in the local imagination.

It was quickly announced that his body would be taxidermied, in connection with the Muséum-Aquarium de Nancy. The museum's head of collections stated in Vosges Matin on 20 April 2012 about the operation: “It is also interesting to welcome Jojo because chimpanzees are rare. We only have one, already old, who is about a hundred years old […]”. On 20 February 2013, one year after his death, Jojo's taxidermied body was presented to the public. It is no longer on display today, as the taxidermy did not achieve unanimous support.

=== Presence in Nancy's Popular Culture ===
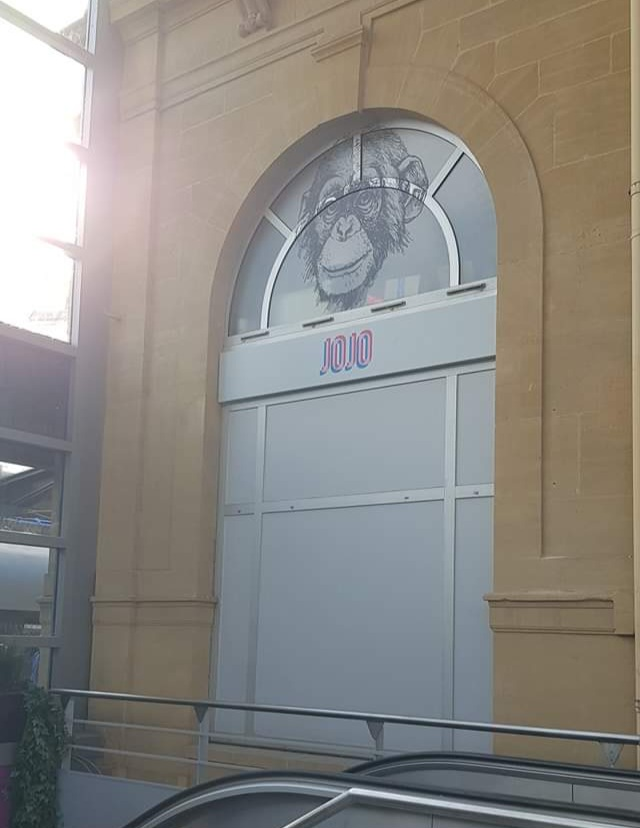
Face of Jojo at the Nancy train station

Jojo became a prominent figure in the local collective imagination in various forms.

His face adorns one of the arches of Nancy-Ville station, which chose to represent several famous Nancy personalities, including the iconic animal.

The name "Jojo" was given to one of the villages at the Saint Nicholas market, located at Place Nelson Mandela, near the Pépinière. This inclusion of the chimpanzee in the Saint Nicholas celebrations of Nancy is listed in the French inventory of Intangible Cultural Heritage.

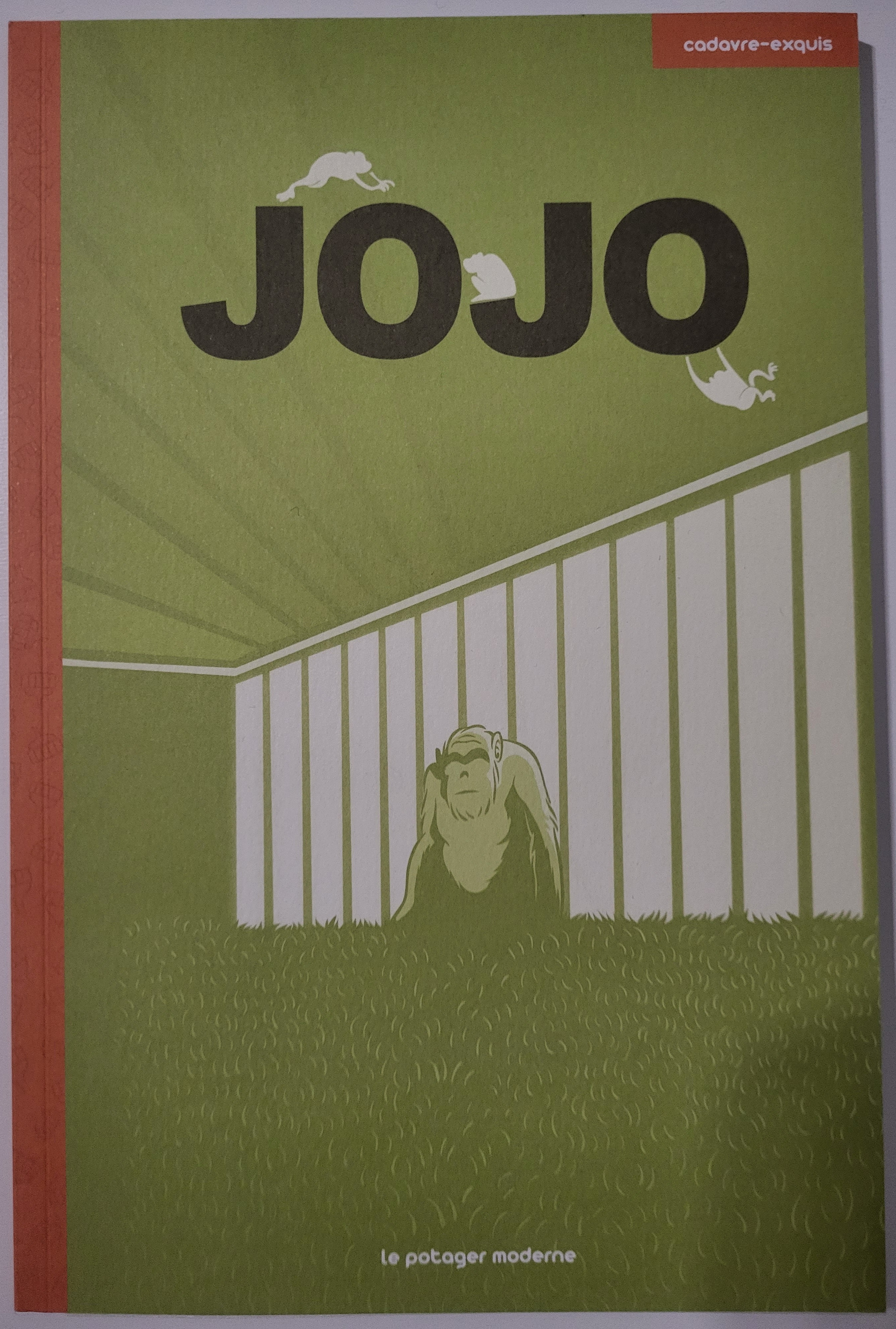
Exquisite corpse drawing telling the story of Jojo the chimpanzee.

He also inspired a local beer called "King Jo" from the Piggy Brewing Company (where he is depicted as a gorilla... a recurring mistake).

His image and story are commemorated at a tram stop in the Grand Nancy.

A Comic Strip exhibition was held in February 2013, a year after Jojo's death, at the Animal Space of the Pépinière. It featured drawings by the collective of authors "La Bande à Jojo" (Paul Filippi, Romain Dieudonné, Aurélie Pertusot, Flora Kam, Thierry Martin, peb & fox, Damien Raymond, Zoé Thouron, Sylvain Moizie, and Sylvain Euriot) intended to tell Jojo's story in a pictorial exquisite corpse.

The renovated building of Nancy Thermal inaugurated in 2023 is decorated with a stew pot featuring the famous chimpanzee.

=== Tribute from the City of Nancy ===
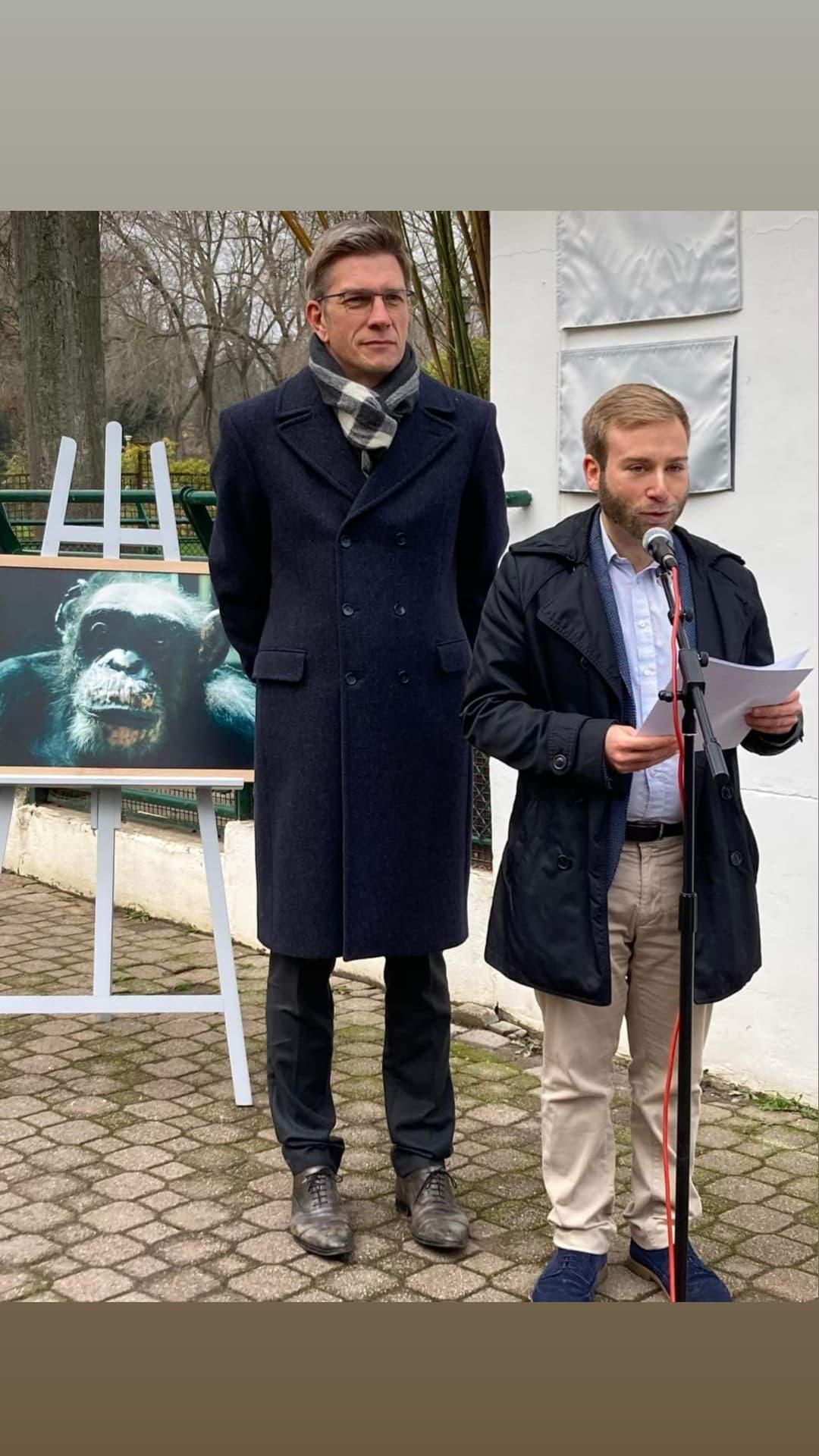
Photo of the inauguration of the Jojo the Chimpanzee alley with, from left to right, Mathieu Klein and Dahman Richter

On 5 December 2022, the Nancy City Council passed the "Charter for Animals in the City" aiming to define a new policy for integrating animals into the city, as well as principles for respecting animal welfare and biodiversity. One provision of this charter granted Jojo, ten years after his death, the unprecedented title of emblematic animal of the city of Nancy, and accordingly named a pathway in the Pépinière park in his honor.

On 10 December 2022, International Animal Rights Day, the pathway crossing the Animal Space of the Pépinière was thus named after the famous chimpanzee. In front of a crowd of citizens, Dahman Richter, delegate municipal councilor for animal rights and welfare, biodiversity, and Mathieu Klein, mayor of Nancy, inaugurated the plaques commemorating Jojo and the animals that accompanied him. Mr. Richter notably stated in his speech:

"We questioned this embarrassing legacy of History, and then we ended up recognizing that it was not normal and feeling ashamed. More than nostalgia, it is indeed shame that dominates our hearts, a general unease that only a posthumous recognition could ease [...] With this plaque and these speeches, we mark History and we forever place Jojo and all the others in the collective memory of the people of Nancy. After the awareness and after the end of wild animals in the animal space, this day symbolizes a page finally turning and remaining turned, a new page opening on which we can move forward."

The mayor, Mathieu Klein, recalled his childhood memories when he visited Jojo with his uncle and stated that animals should no longer be "entertainment."
