= Football Club Flérien =

- Full name: Football Club Flérien
- Founded: 1904
- Ground: Stade du Hazé, Flers
- Capacity: 3,501
- Chairman: D.Lottin
- League: Régional 1
- 2024–25: National 3 Group C, 12th of 14 (Relegated)
| Home colours | Away colours | Third colours |

Football Club Flérien are a football club based in Flers.

== History ==
The club was formed in 1904 as Union Sportive Flérienne. The club briefly changed its name to Sporting Athlétic Flérien for 10 years from 1918, before reverting to its original name. In 1989 the club changed its name to its present name of Football Club Flérien.

The club competed in regional leagues until the end of the 1993–1994 season when they won the Lower Normandy Division of Honour, and promoted to the Championnat National 3. Since then the club has moved up and down between the regional and Championnat National 3.

== Honours ==
- Normandy League Champions (1) 2022-23
- Lower Normandy League Champions (3) 1993–94, 1996–97, 2010-11
- Lower Normandy Cup Winners (3) 1984–85, 1986–87, 2007-08

== Notable Players ==
- (France) Thibault Moulin
- (Benin) Achille Rouga
- (Central African Republic) Ralph Kottoy
- (Senegal) Ismaïla N'Diaye

== Notable Managers ==
- (France) Gilbert Zoonekynd Manager 1990-1992
- (France) Thierry Moreau Manager 2011 - 2013
