= Philippe Durpes =

Guadeloupean footballers (born 1974)

Personal information
- Date of birth: 6 March 1974 (age 52)
- Place of birth: Capesterre, Guadeloupe
- Height: 1.84 m (6 ft 0 in)
- Position: Defender

Team information
- Current team: SO Romorantin
- Number: 17

Senior career*
Years	Team	Apps	(Gls)
1995–1998	RC Lens	3	(0)
1998–2000	Cercle Brugge	55	(4)
2000–2003	Amiens SC	14	(1)
2003–2011	SO Romorantin	197	(6)

International career^{‡}
2007	Guadeloupe	1	(0)
- * Club domestic league appearances and goals as of 07:09, 8 July 2009 (UTC) ‡ National team caps and goals as of 26 January 2009

Philippe Durpes (born 6 March 1974) is a Guadeloupean former footballer who played as a defender.

He played most recently for French Championnat National club SO Romorantin and has played the Guadeloupe national football team once against Costa Rica in 2007.
