= Abdellah Kharbouchi =

Moroccan footballer (born 1980)

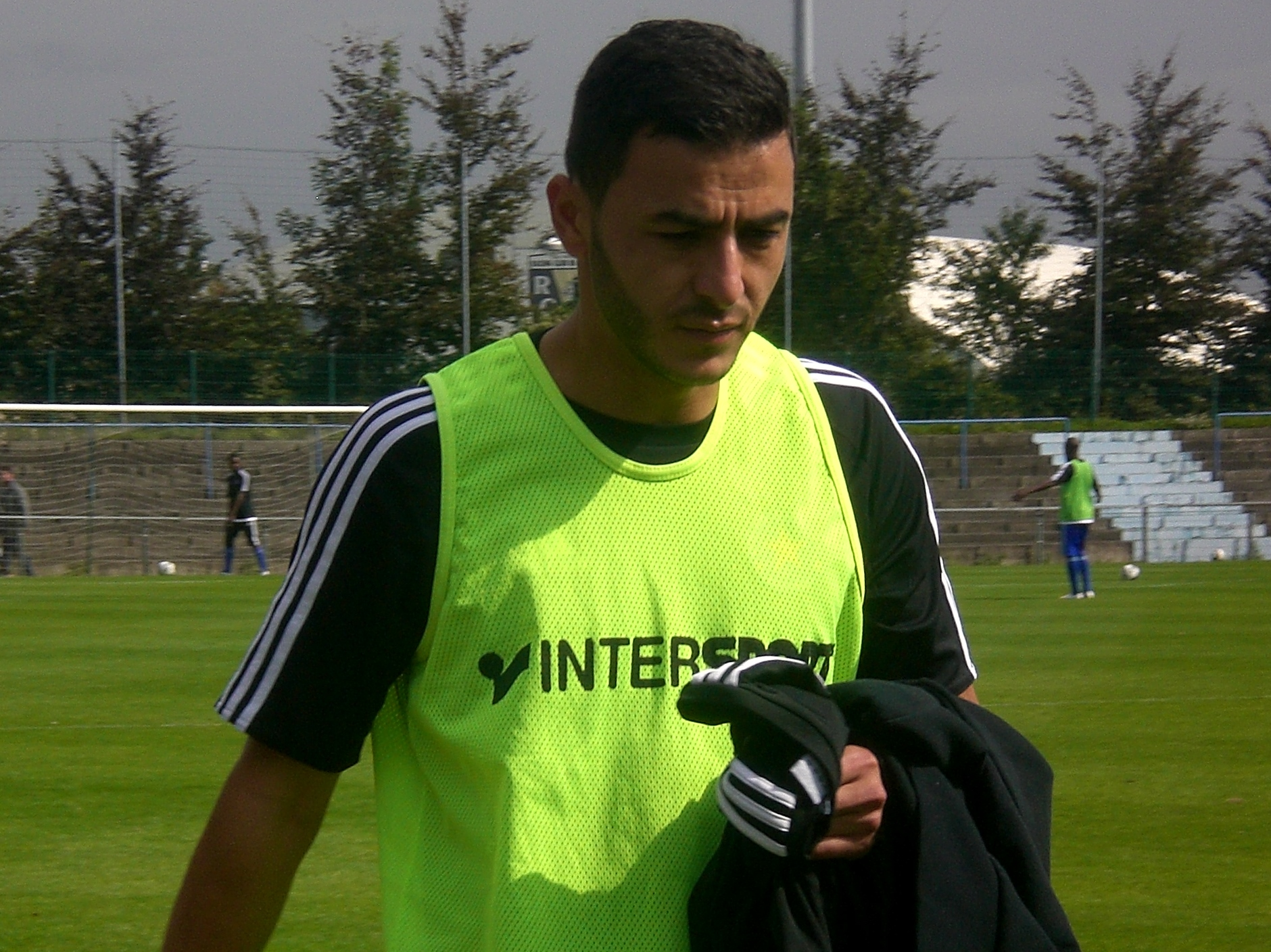
- Kharbouchi in 2015

Personal information
- Full name: Abdellah Kharbouchi
- Date of birth: August 10, 1980 (age 46)
- Place of birth: Beni-Sidel, Morocco
- Height: 1.78 m (5 ft 10 in)
- Position: Midfielder

Team information
- Current team: Villemomble Sports (player-manager)

Senior career*
Years	Team	Apps	(Gls)
1999–2002	Amiens	5	(0)
2003–2004	Racing Paris		
2004–2006	Sète	53	(11)
2006–2008	Le Havre	23	(3)
2007–2008	→ Gueugnon (loan)	21	(4)
2009–2010	Cannes	38	(1)
2010–2012	Amiens	59	(5)
2012–2013	Dunkerque	5	(0)
2013–2014	Villemomble	21	(2)
2014–2016	AC Amiens	45	(2)
2016	US Camon		
2016–2017	US Ailly-Sur-Somme		
2017–2018	AC Amiens	18	(0)
2019–	Villemomble		

Managerial career
- 2019–: Villemomble Sports (player-manager)
- * Club domestic league appearances and goals

Abdellah Kharbouchi (born August 10, 1980) is a Moroccan footballer who is currently player and manager of Villemomble Sports.

He acquired French nationality by naturalization on 20 September 2000.

== Coaching career ==
In the summer 2019, Kharbouchi returned to Villemomble Sports as a player and joint-manager alongside Jean-Claude Tagba.
