= Thierry Moreau =

French footballer (born 1967)

Personal information
- Date of birth: January 17, 1967 (age 59)
- Place of birth: Lisieux, France
- Height: 1.78 m (5 ft 10 in)
- Position: Midfielder

Team information
- Current team: FC Flérien (manager)

Senior career*
Years	Team	Apps	(Gls)
1985–1986	Le Havre	2	(0)
1986–1987	Caen	28	(2)
1987–1994	Le Havre	214	(17)
1994–2001	Toulouse	240	(25)
2001–2003	Amiens	58	(2)

Managerial career
- 2003–2005: Avenir Fonsorbais
- 2009–2010: Caen Maladrerie OS
- 2011–2013: FC Flérien
- * Club domestic league appearances and goals

Thierry Moreau (born 17 January 1967) is a former French professional footballer who played as a midfielder between 1985 and 2003.

Born in Lisieux, he played his entire career in France, for four clubs: Le Havre AC, Stade Malherbe Caen, Toulouse FC and Amiens SC.

For his performances in the 1996–97 French Division 2 season, he was named Ligue 2 Player of the Year.

== Managerial Career ==
Following his retirement from football, he became a manager for lower league football clubs like Avenir Fonsorbais and Caen Maladrerie OS.

In 2011 he was announced coach of FC Flérien, seeing the club relegated in his first year from the Championnat National 2, and then stabilised in the Regional division the following season, his contract was not renewed.
