= Sébastien Maté =

French footballer (born 1972)

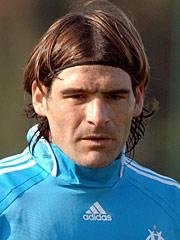

Personal information
- Full name: Sébastien Maté
- Date of birth: September 19, 1972 (age 54)
- Place of birth: Mont-de-Marsan, France
- Height: 1.81 m (5 ft 11 1/2 in)
- Position: Goalkeeper

Senior career*
Years	Team	Apps	(Gls)
1996–1997	Stade Briochin	0	(0)
1997–1998	Cherbourg	33	(0)
1998–1999	Limoges	31	(0)
1999–2000	Laval	0	(0)
2001–2002	Amiens	1	(0)
2003–2007	Entente SSG	119	(0)
2007–2008	Marseille	0	(0)
2008	Aix		
- * Club domestic league appearances and goals as of November 2, 2006

Sébastien Maté (born September 19, 1972) is a retired professional footballer.
