= Julien Outrebon =

French footballer (born 1983)

Personal information
- Date of birth: 16 June 1983 (age 43)
- Place of birth: Épernay, France
- Height: 1.83 m (6 ft 0 in)
- Position: Centre back

Team information
- Current team: Lorient (assistant)

Senior career*
Years	Team	Apps	(Gls)
2000–2001	Amiens B	32	(0)
2001–2006	Amiens	36	(0)
2004–2005	→ AS Cherbourg (loan)	29	(2)
2005–2006	→ L'Entente SSG (loan)	26	(1)
2006–2009	L'Entente SSG	93	(2)
2009–2010	Créteil		
2010–2011	Strasbourg	38	(4)
2011–2013	Troyes	9	(0)
2013–2014	US Luzenac	33	(0)
2015	Amiens	14	(1)
2015–2016	Fréjus Saint-Raphaël	21	(0)
2016–2017	US Luzenac	25	(0)

Managerial career
- 2017–2018: Paris FC (reserves)
- 2017–2019: Paris FC (assistant)
- 2018–2019: Paris FC (U17)
- 2019–: Lorient (assistant)
- * Club domestic league appearances and goals

Julien Outrebon (born 16 June 1983) is a French football coach and former player who is the assistant manager of Lorient.

== Career ==
Outrebon has played professionally in Ligue 2 for Amiens and Troyes.

After retiring at the end of the 2016–17 season, Outrebon became manager of Paris FC's reserve team in the Championnat National 3 and also as assistant manager for the first team. He later also coached the U17's.

In June 2019, he was appointed second assistant manager of Christophe Pelissier at Lorient.

== Personal life ==
Outrebon was born in Épernay. He is married to Bérengère Troch, the daughter of Denis Troch and the brother-in-law of Gautier Troch. The couple has a son called Tiago and a daughter called Lola.
