= Denis Troch =

French footballer and manager (born 1959)

Personal information
- Full name: Denis Troch
- Date of birth: 24 October 1959 (age 67)
- Place of birth: Le Blanc-Mesnil, France
- Height: 1.80 m (5 ft 11 in)
- Position: Goalkeeper

Youth career
- 1973–1978: Red Star

Senior career*
Years	Team	Apps	(Gls)
1978–1981	Paris SG B	?	(?)
1981–1982	Paris FC	?	(?)
1982–1984	RCF Paris	?	(?)
1984–1985	RCF Paris B	6	(0)

Managerial career
- 1989–1991: Charleville
- 1994–1997: Laval
- 1997–1998: Le Havre
- 2000–2004: Amiens
- 2004–2007: Laval
- 2007–2008: Troyes
- 2008–2009: Chamois Niortais
- * Club domestic league appearances and goals

Denis Troch (born 24 October 1959) is a French former professional football player and now manager.

Troch's last job in management was with Chamois Niortais, but he left in June 2009 after the club were relegated to the Championnat de France amateur. He is the father-in-law of current Division 1 ES Troyes AC player, Julien Outrebon.

Denis Troch is the CEO of H-CORT Performance, a mental coach for professional athletes, and a counselor for managers or CEOs. He is currently working with the professional cycling team FDJ-BigMat and many international athletes.

== Playing career ==
In 1978, Troch signed his first professional contract with the second division club team Red Star as goalkeeper. After playing for Paris SG B, Paris FC, and RCF Paris, Troch had to stop his career as a player due to a broken arm. He accepted the post of goalkeeper coach for RCF Paris.

== Coaching career ==
Troch remained goalkeeper coach for RCF Paris until December 1989 when he took the position of head manager at Charleville, low ranked in Division 3. Troch maintained the club in Division 3 in his first season, and almost made the team go to Division 2 for his second season. During the summer of 1991, Artur Jorge hired Troch to be his assistant coach for Paris Saint-Germain. The two men worked together at Racing Paris and accepted the challenge at Paris Saint-Germain where they won the national championship in 1993–94.
