= Michel Rodriguez =

French former football defender (born 1978)

Personal information
- Date of birth: 25 November 1978 (age 47)
- Place of birth: Montpellier, France
- Height: 1.86 m (6 ft 1 in)
- Position: Defender

Senior career*
Years	Team	Apps	(Gls)
1996–2002	Montpellier	64	(2)
2001–2002	→ Amiens (loan)	26	(0)
2002–2004	Cannes	54	(3)
2004–2007	Tours	81	(5)
2007–2009	Laval	55	(2)
2009–2010	Créteil	31	(0)
2010–2014	Rouen	94	(6)

International career
1997	France U18		
- * Club domestic league appearances and goals

Michel Rodriguez (born 25 November 1978, in Montpellier) is a French former footballer who played as a defender. He last played for FC Rouen.

== Career ==
Rodriguez won the 1997 UEFA European Under-18 Championship with France.

== Honours ==
Montpellier

- UEFA Intertoto Cup: 1999
