= Villemomble SF =

French football club

Villemomble
- Full name: Villemomble Sports Football
- Founded: 1922
- Ground: Stade Georges Pompidou
- Capacity: 15,128
- Chairman: (France) Gérard Vivargent
- Manager: Abdellah Kharbouchi & Jean-Claude Tagba
- League: R2 Group D
- 2019–20: R2 Group D, 1st
- Website: http://www.vsfoot.com/index.html
Home colours	Away colours

Villemomble Sports Football is a French football club based in Villemomble (Seine-Saint-Denis). Founded in 1922, it currently plays in the Championnat de France Amateurs (French fourth-tier league), holding home games at the Stade Georges Pompidou.

== Notable players ==
- (France) Maghnes Akliouche (youth)
- (France) Sébastien Corchia (youth)
