= Christophe Wargnier =

French footballer and coach (born 1980)

Personal information
- Date of birth: 25 May 1980 (age 46)
- Place of birth: Eu, France
- Height: 1.80 m (5 ft 11 in)
- Position: Defender

Team information
- Current team: Abbeville

Youth career
- 1986-1989: Ault
- 1989-1993: Friville-Escarbotin
- 1993-1996: Gamaches
- 1996-1999: Amiens

Senior career*
Years	Team	Apps	(Gls)
1999–2002	Amiens	18	(0)
2002–2004	Pontivy	55	(5)
2004-2005	Roye	26	(0)
2005-2007	Châtellerault	30	(0)
2007-2008	Fontenay-le-Comte		
2008-2009	Concarneau		
2009-2015	Abbeville		
2019-2021	Abbeville		

Managerial career
- 2015–2019: Abbeville
- 2019-: Abbeville young
- * Club domestic league appearances and goals

Christophe Wargnier (born 25 May 1980) is a French coach who currently coach as a defender for Division d'Honneur club Abbeville. He previously played professionally with Amiens between 1999 and 2002, and has also assisted Pontivy, Roye and Châtellerault.
