= Football at the 2001 Mediterranean Games – Men's team squads =

Below are the squads for the Football at the 2001 Mediterranean Games, hosted in Tunis, Tunisia, and took place between 5 June and 15 September 2001. Teams were national U-21 sides.

== Group A ==
=== France ===
Head coach: Pierre Mankowski

No.	Pos.	Player	Date of birth (age)	Caps	Goals	Club
	GK	Loïc Vincent	26 January 1980 (aged 21)			(Portuguese Football Federation) Associação Naval 1º de Maio
	GK	Nicolas Douchez	22 April 1980 (aged 21)			(French Football Federation) Le Havre AC
	DF	Nicolas Sahnoun	3 September 1980 (aged 21)			(French Football Federation) FC Girondins de Bordeaux
	DF	Mickaël Pontal	30 April 1980 (aged 21)			(French Football Federation) AS Saint-Étienne
	DF	Cyril Guyot	4 January 1980 (aged 21)			(French Football Federation) Le Havre AC
	DF	David Grondin	8 May 1980 (aged 21)			(The Football Association) Arsenal F.C.
	DF	Sébastien Squillaci	11 August 1980 (aged 21)			(French Football Federation) AS Monaco FC
	MF	Julien Stéphan	18 September 1980 (aged 20)			(French Football Federation) Toulouse FC
	MF	Ludovic Delporte	6 February 1980 (aged 21)			(French Football Federation) RC Lens
	MF	Loris Reina	10 June 1980 (aged 21)			(French Football Federation) Olympique de Marseille
	MF	Cyril Yapi	18 February 1980 (aged 21)			(French Football Federation) Stade Rennais FC
	MF	Florent Balmont	2 February 1980 (aged 21)			(French Football Federation) Olympique Lyonnais
	MF	Guillaume Laval	12 January 1980 (aged 21)			(French Football Federation) Angoulême Charente FC
	MF	Loïc Paillères	20 May 1980 (aged 21)			(French Football Federation) FC Nantes
	FW	Grégory Pujol	25 January 1980 (aged 21)			(French Football Federation) FC Nantes
	FW	Gaël Hiroux	3 August 1980 (aged 21)			(French Football Federation) Paris Saint-Germain FC
	FW	Mickaël Natchimie	4 February 1981 (aged 20)			(French Football Federation) CS Sedan Ardennes
	FW	David Vandenbossche	27 September 1980 (aged 20)			(French Football Federation) AJ Auxerre

=== San Marino ===
Head coach: Giorgio Leoni

No.	Pos.	Player	Date of birth (age)	Caps	Goals	Club
	GK	Federico Valentini	22 January 1982 (aged 19)			(Italian Football Federation) Valleverde Riccione
	GK	Gabriele Frisoni	3 December 1980 (aged 20)			(San Marino Football Federation) SS Pennarossa
	DF	Nicola Albani	15 April 1981 (aged 20)			(San Marino Football Federation) SS Murata
	DF	Gianluca Bollini	24 March 1980 (aged 21)			(San Marino Football Federation) SP Cailungo
	DF	Federico Crescentini	13 April 1982 (aged 19)			(San Marino Football Federation) Virtus Villa
	DF	Alessandro Della Valle	8 June 1982 (aged 19)			(San Marino Football Federation) San Marino Calcio
	DF	Matteo Andreini	10 October 1981 (aged 19)			(San Marino Football Federation) SP Cailungo
	DF	Nicola Raschi	22 January 1981 (aged 20)			(San Marino Football Federation)
	MF	Michele Moretti	26 October 1981 (aged 19)			(San Marino Football Federation) AC Juvenes/Dogana
	MF	Michele Marani	16 November 1982 (aged 18)			(San Marino Football Federation) San Marino Calcio
	MF	Carlo Valentini	15 March 1982 (aged 19)			(San Marino Football Federation) FC Domagnano
	MF	Manuel Francesconi	11 June 1983 (aged 18)			(San Marino Football Federation) SP Tre Fiori
	MF	Giacomo Maiani	10 July 1982 (aged 19)			(San Marino Football Federation) San Marino Calcio
	MF	Simone Celli	10 September 1982 (aged 18)			(San Marino Football Federation)
	FW	Alan Toccaceli	14 April 1983 (aged 18)			(San Marino Football Federation) AC Libertas
	FW	Roberto Selva	2 January 1981 (aged 20)			(San Marino Football Federation) SP La Fiorita
	FW	Massimo Marani	7 June 1984 (aged 17)			(San Marino Football Federation) San Marino Calcio
	FW	Federico Amici	27 March 1982 (aged 19)			(San Marino Football Federation) SP Tre Fiori

=== Tunisia ===
Head coach: Khemaïs Laabidi

No.	Pos.	Player	Date of birth (age)	Caps	Goals	Club
	GK	Walid Ben Hassine	16 March 1982 (aged 19)	0	0	(Tunisian Football Federation) CS Sfaxien
	GK	Anis Zitouni	8 September 1982 (aged 18)	0	0	(Tunisian Football Federation) Club Africain
	DF	Saïf Ghezal	30 June 1981 (aged 20)	0	0	(Tunisian Football Federation) ES Sahel
	DF	Karim Hamida	24 April 1981 (aged 20)	0	0	(French Football Federation) Stade Rennais
	DF	Chokri Zaalani	9 October 1980 (aged 20)	0	0	(Tunisian Football Federation) Club Africain
	DF	Alaeddine Yahia	26 September 1981 (aged 19)	0	0	(French Football Federation) EA Guingamp
	DF	Anis Ayari	16 February 1982 (aged 19)	0	0	(Tunisian Football Federation) Stade Tunisien
	DF	Anis Boussaïdi	10 April 1981 (aged 20)	0	0	(Tunisian Football Federation) Stade Tunisien
	MF	Ahmed Hammi	9 November 1981 (aged 19)	0	0	(Tunisian Football Federation) CS Sfaxien
	MF	Ahmed Khanchil	27 February 1982 (aged 19)	0	0	(Tunisian Football Federation) Stade Tunisien
	MF	Lassaâd Ouertani	2 May 1980 (aged 21)	0	0	(Tunisian Football Federation) Stade Tunisien
	MF	Selim Benachour	8 September 1981 (aged 19)	0	0	(French Football Federation) Paris SG
	MF	Imed Bouthouri	1 August 1980 (aged 21)	0	0	(Tunisian Football Federation) Club Africain
	MF	Karim Dalhoum	17 July 1981 (aged 20)	0	0	(Tunisian Football Federation) CS Sfaxien
	MF	Achraf Khalfaoui	24 October 1980 (aged 20)	0	0	(Tunisian Football Federation) Club Africain
	FW	Ali Zitouni	11 January 1981 (aged 20)	0	0	(Tunisian Football Federation) ES Tunis
	FW	Bassam Daâssi	13 September 1980 (aged 20)	0	0	(Tunisian Football Federation) Stade Tunisien
	FW	Mohamed Sliti	28 March 1981 (aged 20)	0	0	(Tunisian Football Federation) Olympique Béja

== Group B ==
=== Greece ===
Head coach: Andreas Michalopoulos

No.	Pos.	Player	Date of birth (age)	Caps	Goals	Club
	GK	Stefanos Kotsolis	5 June 1979 (aged 22)			(Hellenic Football Federation) Panathinaikos
	GK	Dimitrios Eleftheropoulos	7 August 1976 (aged 25)			(Hellenic Football Federation) Olympiacos
	DF	Georgios Seitaridis	4 June 1981 (aged 20)			(Hellenic Football Federation) Panathinaikos
	DF	Sotirios Kyrgiakos	23 July 1979 (aged 22)			(Hellenic Football Federation) Panathinaikos
	DF	Stathis Tavlaridis	25 January 1980 (aged 21)			(The Football Association) Arsenal
	DF	Georgios Kyriazis	22 February 1980 (aged 21)			(Hellenic Football Federation) Iraklis
	DF	Vangelis Nastos	13 September 1980 (aged 20)			(Hellenic Football Federation) PAOK
	DF	Konstantinos Loumpoutis	10 June 1979 (aged 22)			(Hellenic Football Federation) Aris
	DF	Christos Patsatzoglou	19 March 1979 (aged 22)			(Hellenic Football Federation) Olympiacos
	MF	Giannis Taralidis	17 May 1981 (aged 20)			(Hellenic Football Federation) Paniliakos
	MF	Giorgos Theodoridis	3 July 1980 (aged 21)			(Hellenic Football Federation) Aris
	MF	Xenofon Gitas	22 June 1979 (aged 22)			(Hellenic Football Federation) Giannina
	MF	Sokratis Petrou	8 May 1979 (aged 22)			(Hellenic Football Federation) Xanthi
	MF	Konstantinos Katsouranis	21 June 1979 (aged 22)			(Hellenic Football Federation) Panachaiki
	FW	Dimitrios Papadopoulos	20 October 1981 (aged 19)			(The Football Association) Burnley
	FW	Dimitrios Salpingidis	18 August 1981 (aged 20)			(Hellenic Football Federation) PAOK
	FW	Giannis Amanatidis	3 December 1981 (aged 19)			(German Football Association) VfB Stuttgart
	FW	Georgios Vakouftsis	30 January 1980 (aged 21)			(Italian Football Federation) Fiorentina

=== Turkey ===
Head coach: Raşit Çetiner

No.	Pos.	Player	Date of birth (age)	Caps	Goals	Club
1	GK	Orkun Usak	5 November 1980 (aged 20)			(Turkish Football Federation) Elazığspor
2	DF	Mustafa Yalçınkaya	18 August 1981 (aged 20)			(Turkish Football Federation) Antalyaspor
3	DF	Egemen Korkmaz	3 November 1982 (aged 18)			(Turkish Football Federation) Kartalspor
4	DF	İbrahim Yavuz	10 November 1982 (aged 18)			(Turkish Football Federation) Adanaspor
5	DF	Mehmet Kahriman	6 August 1980 (aged 21)			(Turkish Football Federation) Trabzonspor
6	MF	Utku Yılmaz	26 November 1981 (aged 19)			(Turkish Football Federation) Gençlerbirliği
7	DF	Tunç Kip	13 February 1981 (aged 20)			(Turkish Football Federation) Beşiktaş
8	FW	Necati Ateş	3 January 1980 (aged 21)			(Turkish Football Federation) Altay
9	MF	Ömer Ateş	14 August 1981 (aged 20)			(Turkish Football Federation) Galatasaray
10	MF	Faruk Atalay	18 March 1981 (aged 20)			(Turkish Football Federation) Galatasaray
11	FW	Tuncay Şanlı	16 January 1982 (aged 19)			(Turkish Football Federation) Sakaryaspor
12	GK	Volkan Demirel	27 October 1981 (aged 19)			(Turkish Football Federation) Kartalspor
13	MF	Hamit Altıntop	8 December 1982 (aged 18)			(German Football Association) SG Wattenscheid 09
14	FW	Hasan Tunçel	26 February 1980 (aged 21)			(Turkish Football Federation) Sakaryaspor
15	DF	Gökhan Yıldız	21 February 1983 (aged 18)			(Turkish Football Federation) Galatasaray
16	MF	Eyüp Kaymakçı	26 September 1981 (aged 19)			(Turkish Football Federation) Galatasaray
17	MF	Ümit Aydın	16 January 1980 (aged 21)			(Turkish Football Federation) Galatasaray
18	MF	Selçuk Şahin	31 January 1981 (aged 20)			(Turkish Football Federation) İstanbulspor

== Group C ==
=== Algeria ===
Head coach: Mokhtar Kalem and Mustapha Seridi

No.	Pos.	Player	Date of birth (age)	Caps	Goals	Club
	GK	Merouane Abdouni	27 March 1981 (aged 20)	0	0	(Algerian Football Federation) USM El Harrach
	GK	Rachid Khentache	3 March 1982 (aged 19)	0	0	(Algerian Football Federation) CR Belouizdad
	GK	Yacine Djebarat	27 January 1981 (aged 20)	0	0	(Algerian Football Federation) JSM Béjaïa
	DF	Mohamed Deghmoum	28 November 1980 (aged 20)	0	0	(Algerian Football Federation) USM El Harrach
	DF	Samir Zazou	24 March 1980 (aged 21)	0	0	(Algerian Football Federation) CR Belouizdad
	DF	Zoubir Ouasti	28 February 1981 (aged 20)	0	0	(Algerian Football Federation) MC Oran
	DF	Mohamed Frih Bengabou	15 January 1982 (aged 19)	0	0	(Algerian Football Federation) ASM Oran
	DF	Abdelkader Laïfaoui	29 July 1981 (aged 20)	0	0	(Algerian Football Federation) OMR El Annasser
	DF	Aziz Irmal		0	0	(Algerian Football Federation) MC Alger
	MF	Mohamed Nabil Bellat	29 January 1982 (aged 19)	0	0	(Algerian Football Federation) USM El Harrach
	MF	Mehdi Boudar	2 March 1980 (aged 21)	0	0	(Algerian Football Federation) USM Annaba
	MF	Mohamed Aoun Seghir	27 August 1983 (aged 18)	0	0	(Algerian Football Federation) USM Blida
	MF	Yacine Bezzaz	10 July 1981 (aged 20)	0	0	(Algerian Football Federation) JS Kabylie
	MF	Kamel Marek	6 February 1980 (aged 21)	0	0	(Algerian Football Federation) JSM Béjaïa
	MF	Lamouri Djediat	20 January 1981 (aged 20)	0	0	(Algerian Football Federation) E Sour El Ghozlane
	FW	Abdelaziz Rouaïghia	10 February 1981 (aged 20)	0	0	(Algerian Football Federation) NARB Réghaïa
	FW	Adel El Hadi	18 January 1980 (aged 21)	0	0	(Algerian Football Federation) CR Belouizdad
	FW	Redouane Zouaghi	15 November 1981 (aged 19)	0	0	(Algerian Football Federation) CA Batna
	FW	Adlène Bensaïd	3 November 1981 (aged 19)	0	0	(Algerian Football Federation) USM Annaba
	FW	Fouad Naceri	9 May 1983 (aged 18)	0	0	(Algerian Football Federation) JSM Béjaïa
	FW	Ali Boulebda	21 August 1980 (aged 21)	0	0	(French Football Federation) Nîmes Olympique
	FW	Salem Hamouda	1 August 1981 (aged 20)	0	0	(Algerian Football Federation) RC Kouba

=== Italy ===
Head coach: Francesco Rocca

No.	Pos.	Player	Date of birth (age)	Caps	Goals	Club
	GK	Vitangelo Spadavecchia	25 November 1982 (aged 18)			(Italian Football Federation) Bari
	GK	Gianluca Pegolo	25 March 1981 (aged 20)			(Italian Football Federation) Verona
	DF	Cristian Zaccardo	21 December 1981 (aged 19)			(Italian Football Federation) Bologna
	DF	Christian Maggio	11 February 1982 (aged 19)			(Italian Football Federation) Vicenza
	DF	Riccardo Fissore	18 February 1980 (aged 21)			(Italian Football Federation) Torino
	DF	Roberto Cardinale	12 June 1981 (aged 20)			(Italian Football Federation) Salernitana
	DF	Andrea Dossena	11 September 1981 (aged 19)			(Italian Football Federation) Verona
	DF	Federico Balzaretti	6 December 1981 (aged 19)			(Italian Football Federation) Torino
	MF	Simone Pacini	8 January 1981 (aged 20)			(Italian Football Federation) Cesena
	MF	Marco Mancinelli	31 January 1982 (aged 19)			(Italian Football Federation) Verona
	MF	Simonluca Agazzone	23 July 1981 (aged 20)			(Italian Football Federation) Monza
	MF	Angelo Palombo	25 September 1981 (aged 19)			(Italian Football Federation) Fiorentina
	MF	Franco Semioli	20 June 1980 (aged 21)			(Italian Football Federation) Torino
	FW	Emanuele Calaiò	8 January 1982 (aged 19)			(Italian Football Federation) Torino
	FW	Giuseppe Sculli	23 March 1981 (aged 20)			(Italian Football Federation) Juventus
	FW	Luca Del Chiaro	21 January 1981 (aged 20)			(Italian Football Federation) Lucchese
	FW	Alessandro Pellicori	22 July 1981 (aged 20)			(Italian Football Federation) Lecce
	FW	Marco Ferro	7 August 1981 (aged 20)			(Italian Football Federation) Pistoiese

=== Morocco ===
Head coach: Mustapha Madih

No.	Pos.	Player	Date of birth (age)	Caps	Goals	Club
1	GK	Omar Charef	19 February 1981 (aged 20)			(Royal Moroccan Football Federation) Mouloudia Club d'Oujda
	DF	Badr El Kaddouri	31 January 1981 (aged 20)			(Royal Moroccan Football Federation) Wydad Casablanca
	DF	Hassan El Mouataz	21 September 1981 (aged 19)			(Royal Moroccan Football Federation) FAR Rabat
	MF	Zakaria Aboub	3 June 1980 (aged 21)			(Royal Moroccan Football Federation) Raja Casablanca
	MF	Redouane El Ouardi	13 November 1981 (aged 19)			(French Football Federation) RC Lens
	MF	Aziz Souidi	21 January 1979 (aged 22)			(Royal Moroccan Football Federation) FUS Rabat
	FW	Mustapha Allaoui	30 May 1983 (aged 18)			(Royal Moroccan Football Federation) MAS Fes
	FW	Bouabid Bouden	1 February 1982 (aged 19)			(French Football Federation) Lens
	FW	Saïd Kharazi	1 August 1982 (aged 18)			(Royal Moroccan Football Federation) Raja Casablanca
	FW	Jaouad Akaddar	9 September 1984 (aged 16)			(Royal Moroccan Football Federation) Olympique Khouribga
