= Football at the 2001 Mediterranean Games =

2001 Mediterranean Games football tournament
Tournament details
- Host country: Tunisia
- City: Tunis
- Dates: 6–15 September
- Teams: 9
- Venue: 5 (in 4 host cities)

Final positions
- Champions: Tunisia (1st title)
- Runners-up: Italy
- Third place: France
- Fourth place: Turkey

Tournament statistics
- Matches played: 13
- Goals scored: 36 (2.77 per match)
- Top scorer(s): (Italy) Emanuele Calaiò (Tunisia) Selim Benachour (France) Gaël Hiroux (France) Grégory Pujol (France) Nicolas Sahnoun (France) Mickaël Pontal (Morocco) Bouabid Bouden (2 goals each)

The 2001 Mediterranean Games football tournament was the 14th edition of the Mediterranean Games men's football tournament. The football tournament was held in Tunis, Tunisia between 6 and 15 September 2001 as part of the 2001 Mediterranean Games and was contested by 9 teams, all countries were represented by the U-21 teams. Tunisia won the gold medal.

== Participating teams ==
Nine teams for under-21 took part in the tournament, 4 teams from Africa and 5 teams from Europe.

Federation	Nation
CAF Africa	Algeria; Libya; Morocco; Tunisia (hosts)
AFC Asia	None
UEFA Europe	France; Greece; Italy (holders); San Marino; Turkey

== Venues ==
Cities	Venues	Capacity
Radès	Stade du 7 Novembre	60,000
Tunis	Stade El Menzah	45,000
Sousse	Stade Olympique de Sousse	28,000
Sfax	Stade Taïeb Mhiri	22,000
Bizerte	Stade 15 Octobre	20,000

== Tournament ==
All times local: CEST (UTC+1)

Key to colours in group tables
Group winners advance to the Semi-finals

=== Group stage ===
==== Group A ====
Team	Pld	W	D	L	GF	GA	GD	Pts
France	2	2	0	0	7	0	+7	6
Tunisia	2	1	0	1	5	1	+4	3
San Marino	2	0	0	2	0	11	−11	0

6 September 2001

Tunisia	5–0	San Marino
Benachour 4'; Sliti 24' (pen.); Daâssi 30'; Dalhoum 60' (pen.); Khanchil 67'	Report

Stade El Menzah, Tunis

9 September 2001

Tunisia	0–1	France
		Sahnoun 11'

Stade El Menzah, Tunis

11 September 2001

France	6–0	San Marino
Sahnoun 14' (pen.); Hiroux 24', 31' (pen.); Pontal 29', 84'; Delporte 68'	Report

Stade 15 Octobre, Bizerte

==== Group B ====
Team	Pld	W	D	L	GF	GA	GD	Pts
Turkey	2	1	1	0	3	2	+1	4
Greece	2	1	0	1	2	2	0	3
Libya	2	0	1	1	1	2	−1	1

6 September 2001

Greece	1–2	Turkey
Vakouftsis 10'	Report	Şanlı 9'; Yalçınkaya 44'

Stade Olympique de Sousse, Sousse
Referee: Mohamed Gennokza (Tunisia)

9 September 2001

Turkey	1–1	Libya
Aydın 60'		?

Stade Olympique de Sousse, Sousse

11 September 2001

Greece	1–0	Libya
Kyriazis 51' (pen.)

Stade Olympique de Sousse, Sousse

==== Group C ====
Team	Pld	W	D	L	GF	GA	GD	Pts
Italy	2	2	0	0	4	2	+2	6
Morocco	2	1	0	1	6	4	+2	3
Algeria	2	0	0	2	3	7	−4	0

5 September 2001

Morocco	5–2	Algeria
Kherrazi 35'; Bouden 59', 77'; Laïfaoui 73' (o.g.); El Ouardi 85' (pen.)	Report	El Hadi 23'; Bouras 43'; Ouasti (red card)

Stade Taïeb Mhiri, Sfax
Referee: Atef Yacoubi (Tunisia)

8 September 2001

Italy	2–1	Morocco
Sculli 42'; Ferro 81'	Report	Aboub 25'

Stade Taïeb Mhiri, Sfax
Referee: ? (Greece)

10 September 2001

Italy	2–1	Algeria
Calaiò 20', 52'	Report	Zouaghi 90+3'

Stade Taïeb Mhiri, Sfax
Attendance: 6,000
Referee: Moulin (France)

=== Knockout stage ===
Semifinals
13 September – Bizerte
France	0
Italy	1
13 September – Tunis
Turkey	0
Tunisia (a.e.t.)	1

Final
15 September – Radès
Italy	0
Tunisia	1
Third place
15 September – Radès
France	2
Turkey	0

==== Semi-finals ====
13 September 2001

France	0–1	Italy
Grondin (red card) 7'; Delporte (red card) 48'	Report	Cardinale 59'

Stade 15 Octobre, Bizerte
Referee: Mohamed Abdalla (Libya)

13 September 2001

Turkey	0–1 (a.e.t.)	Tunisia
		Benachour 96'

Stade El Menzah, Tunis
Referee: Stefano Farina (Italy)

==== Third place match ====
15 September 2001

France	2–0	Turkey
Pujol 52', 73'	Report

Stade du 7 Novembre, Radès
Referee: Adel Zahmoul (Tunisia)

==== Final ====
15 September 2001

Italy	0–1	Tunisia
Cardinale (red card) 7'	Report	Zitouni 76' (pen.)

Stade du 7 Novembre, Radès
Attendance: 55,000
Referee: Ali Aydın (Turkey)

== Medalists ==
Gold	Silver	Bronze
Tunisia Walid Ben Hassine; Saïf Ghezal; Ali Zitouni; Imed Bouthouri; Karim Hamida; Ahmed Hammi; Ahmed Khanchil; Chokri Zaalani; Bassam Daasi; Karim Dalhoum; Mohamed Sliti; Lassaad Ouertani; Slim Ben Achour; Alaeddine Yahia; Anis Ayari; Anis Zitouni; Anis Boussaidi; Achraf Khalfaoui	Italy Vitangelo Spadavecchia; Cristian Zaccardo; Christian Maggio; Riccardo Fissore; Roberto Cardinale; Andrea Dossena; Simone Pacini; Emanuele Calaiò; Marco Mancinelli; Giuseppe Sculli; Gianluca Pegolo; Luca Del Chiaro; Simonluca Agazzone; Federico Balzaretti; Angelo Palombo; Franco Semioli; Marco Ferro; Alessandro Pellicori	France Loïc Vincent; Mickaël Natchimie; Nicolas Sahnoun; Mickaël Pontal; Cyril Guyot; David Grondin; Grégory Pujol; Loris Reina; Gael Hiroux; Ludovic Delporte; Cyril Yapi; Sebastien Squillacci; Florent Balmont; Loic Pailleres; Nicolas Douchez; David Vandenbossche; Julien Stephan; Guillaume Laval

== Final standings ==
Pos	Team	Pld	W	D	L	GF	GA	GD	Pts	Final result
1st place, gold medalist(s)	Tunisia (H)	4	3	0	1	7	1	+6	9	Gold Medal
2nd place, silver medalist(s)	Italy	4	3	0	1	5	3	+2	9	Silver Medal
3rd place, bronze medalist(s)	France	4	3	0	1	9	1	+8	9	Bronze Medal
4	Turkey	4	1	1	2	3	5	−2	4	Fourth place
5	Morocco	2	1	0	1	6	4	+2	3	Eliminated in group stage
6	Greece	2	1	0	1	2	2	0	3	Eliminated in group stage
7	Libya	2	0	1	1	1	2	−1	1	Eliminated in group stage
8	Algeria	2	0	0	2	3	7	−4	0	Eliminated in group stage
9	San Marino	2	0	0	2	0	11	−11	0	Eliminated in group stage

(H) Hosts
