= 2001 Arab Cup Winners' Cup =

الكأس العربية للأندية الفائزة بالكؤوس 2001

Tournament details
- Host country: Tunisia
- City: Tunis
- Dates: 26 February – 10 March 2002
- Teams: 9 (from UAFA confederations)
- Venues: 2 (in 1 host city)

Final positions
- Champions: (Tunisia) Stade Tunisien (2nd title)
- Runners-up: (Sudan) Al-Hilal

Tournament statistics
- Matches played: 11
- Goals scored: 42 (3.82 per match)
- Top scorer: (Tunisia) Bessam Daassi (4 goals)
- Best player: (Tunisia) Jameleddine Limam
- Best goalkeeper: (Saudi Arabia) Mohamed Al-Deayea
- Fair play award: (Saudi Arabia) Al-Hilal

The 2001 Arab Cup Winners' Cup was the 12th and the last edition of the Arab Cup Winners' Cup held in Tunis, Tunisia between 26 February – 10 March 2002. The teams represented Arab nations from Africa and Asia. Stade Tunisien from Tunisia won the final against Al-Hilal from Sudan for the second time.

This was the last Arab Cup Winners' Cup; the tournament merges with the Arab Club Champions Cup and the Arab Super Cup to create in 2002 one tournament called Prince Faisal bin Fahd Tournament for Arab Clubs.

== Qualifying round ==
Stade Tunisien (the hosts) and Al-Hilal Riyadh (the holders) qualified automatically.

== Group stage ==
=== Group A ===
| Team | Pld | W | D | L | GF | GA | GD | Pts |
|---|---|---|---|---|---|---|---|---|
| (Sudan) Al-Hilal Omdurman | 4 | 2 | 2 | 0 | 6 | 2 | +4 | 8 |
| (Tunisia) Stade Tunisien | 4 | 2 | 1 | 1 | 11 | 5 | +6 | 7 |
| (Kuwait) Al-Salmiya | 4 | 2 | 0 | 2 | 4 | 5 | −1 | 6 |
| (Palestine) Al-Aqsa SC | 4 | 1 | 2 | 1 | 3 | 3 | 0 | 5 |
| (Bahrain) East Riffa Club | 4 | 0 | 1 | 3 | 1 | 12 | −11 | 1 |

26 February 2002

| Stade Tunisien (Tunisia) | 1–1 | (Sudan) Al-Hilal Omdurman |
|---|---|---|
| Sellami 20' (pen.) | | 27' Al-Shoala |

Tunis
26 February 2002

| East Riffa Club (Bahrain) | 1–1 | (Palestine) Al-Aqsa SC |
|---|---|---|
| Jasem 85' (pen.) | | 25' Al-Swerki |

Tunis

28 February 2002

| Al-Hilal Omdurman (Sudan) | 2–1 | (Kuwait) Al-Salmiya |
|---|---|---|
| Mujahed 43'; Jolit 82' | | 35' Marwi |

Tunis
28 February 2002

| Stade Tunisien (Tunisia) | 1–2 | (Palestine) Al-Aqsa SC |
|---|---|---|
| Limam 37' | | 49', 64' Al-Kord |

Tunis

2 March 2002

| Al-Salmiya (Kuwait) | 1–0 | (Palestine) Al-Aqsa SC |
|---|---|---|
| Sira 90+3' |

Tunis
2 March 2002

| Stade Tunisien (Tunisia) | 6–2 | (Bahrain) East Riffa Club |
|---|---|---|
| Daâssi 7', 68', 70'; Sellami 32'; Limam 65' | | 5' Abdulrazzaq; 85' Al-Nisf |

Tunis

4 March 2002

| Al-Aqsa SC (Palestine) | 0–0 | (Sudan) Al-Hilal Omdurman |

Tunis
4 March 2002

| East Riffa Club (Bahrain) | 0–2 | (Kuwait) Al-Salmiya |
|---|---|---|
| | | 58' Abdulmohsen; 60' Marwi |

Tunis

6 March 2002

| Al-Hilal Omdurman (Sudan) | 3–0 | (Bahrain) East Riffa Club |
|---|---|---|
| Aldai 4'; James 73'; Tebri 80' |

Tunis
6 March 2002

| Al-Salmiya (Kuwait) | 0–3 | (Tunisia) Stade Tunisien |
|---|---|---|
| | | 11' M. Zenaidi; 28' T. Zenaidi; 63' Selliti |

Tunis

=== Group B ===
| Team | Pld | W | D | L | GF | GA | GD | Pts |
|---|---|---|---|---|---|---|---|---|
| (Saudi Arabia) Al-Hilal Riyadh | 3 | 2 | 1 | 0 | 3 | 0 | +3 | 7 |
| (Syria) Al-Jaish | 3 | 2 | 0 | 1 | 3 | 1 | +2 | 6 |
| (United Arab Emirates) Al-Shaab | 3 | 1 | 0 | 2 | 2 | 3 | −1 | 3 |
| (Libya) Swehly SC | 3 | 0 | 1 | 2 | 0 | 4 | −4 | 1 |

27 February 2002

| Al-Hilal Riyadh (Saudi Arabia) | 1–0 | (Syria) Al-Jaish |
|---|---|---|
| Gato 45' |

Tunis
27 February 2002

| Swehly SC (Libya) | 0–2 | (United Arab Emirates) Al-Shaab |
|---|---|---|
| | | 62' Saif; 76' Faye |

Tunis

1 March 2002

| Swehly SC (Libya) | 0–2 | (Syria) Al-Jaish |
|---|---|---|
| | | 49' Al-Hariri; 90+1' Musa |

Tunis
1 March 2002

| Al-Hilal Riyadh (Saudi Arabia) | 2–0 | (United Arab Emirates) Al-Shaab |
|---|---|---|
| Al-Temyat 9'; Edmilson 57' |

Tunis

3 March 2002

| Al-Shaab (United Arab Emirates) | 0–1 | (Syria) Al-Jaish |
|---|---|---|
| | | 49' Al-Rashed |

Tunis
3 March 2002

| Al-Hilal Riyadh (Saudi Arabia) | 0–0 | (Libya) Swehly SC |

Tunis

== Knock-out stage ==
Semi-finals
8 March – Tunis
(Sudan) Al-Hilal Omdurman (p) | 0 (9)
(Syria) Al-Jaish | 0 (8)
8 March – Tunis
(Saudi Arabia) Al-Hilal Riyadh | 1
(Tunisia) Stade Tunisien | 2

Final
10 March – Tunis
(Sudan) Al-Hilal Omdurman | 1
(Tunisia) Stade Tunisien | 3

=== Semi-finals ===
8 March 2002

| Al-Hilal Omdurman (Sudan) | 0–0 | (Syria) Al-Jaish |
Penalties
| | 9–8 |

Tunis

8 March 2002

| Al-Hilal Riyadh (Saudi Arabia) | 1–2 | (Tunisia) Stade Tunisien |
|---|---|---|
| Edmilson 80' | | 28' Selliti; 56' M. Zenaidi |

Tunis

=== Final ===
10 March 2002

| Al-Hilal Omdurman (Sudan) | 1–3 | (Tunisia) Stade Tunisien |
|---|---|---|
| Kamal 45' | | 7', 41' Selliti; 24' M. Zenaidi |

Stade Chedly Zouiten, Tunis
Attendance: 20 000
Referee: Abdel Hakim Shelmani (Libya)

== Winners ==
2001 Arab Cup Winners' Cup
(Tunisia)
Stade Tunisien
Second title
