= Sellami =

Sellami is a surname. Notable people with the surname include:

- Jamal Sellami (born 1970), Moroccan football manager and former player
- Lotfi Sellami (born 1978), Tunisian football manager and former player
- Oussama Sellami (born 1979), Tunisian former footballer
- Samir Sellami (born 1977), Tunisian volleyballer
