= 2002 Arab Unified Club Championship =

2002 Prince Faisal bin Fahd Tournament for Arab Clubs
بطولة الاندية العربية الموحدة 2002 بطولة الأمير فيصل بن فهد للأندية العربية 2002

Tournament details
- Host country: Saudi Arabia
- Dates: 17 January – 2 February 2003
- Teams: (from 1 association)

Final positions
- Champions: (Saudi Arabia) Al-Ahli (Jeddah) (1st title)
- Runners-up: (Tunisia) Club Africain
- Third place: (Saudi Arabia) Al-Ittihad
- Fourth place: (Tunisia) Stade Tunisien

Tournament statistics
- Top scorer(s): (Tunisia) Adel Sellimi (5 goals)
- Best player: (Saudi Arabia) Talal Al-Meshal
- Best goalkeeper: (Libya) Abdullah Al Ammami

2002 Arab Unified Club Championship, known officially as the 2002 Prince Faisal bin Fahd Tournament for Arab Clubs, was the 18th UAFA Club Cup, and the 1st since the Arab Club Champions Cup and Arab Cup Winners' Cup were unified. The tournament was originally scheduled for 18 – 31 August 2002 in Morocco, hosted by MAS Fez. it was then postponed to 17 January – 2 February 2003, to be held in Fez and Casablanca, and finally moved to Jeddah.

== Final stage ==
WA Casablanca enter as Moroccan club chosen by organisers in October, but could not enter the Jeddah tournament; they were replaced by Al-Ittihad Jeddah as second club of the host country.
Palestine representatives Al-Aqsa SC had to withdraw due to the Israeli government restricting the freedom of movement of Palestines in the occupied territories.

=== First round ===
==== Group 1 ====
Team	Pld	W	D	L	GF	GA	GD	Pts
(Saudi Arabia) Al-Ittihad	2	2	0	0	11	1	+10	6
(Kuwait) Al-Qadsia	2	1	1	0	2	0	+2	4
(Syria) Al-Wahda	2	0	0	2	1	9	−8	0

17 January 2003

Al-Ittihad (Saudi Arabia)	4 – 1	(Kuwait) Al-Qadsia
Noor 19'; Sérgio 38'; Landomar 54' (pen.); Idris 65'		Al Enezi 52' (pen.)

Jeddah

19 January 2003

Al-Qadsia (Kuwait)	2 – 1	(Syria) Al-Wahda
Al Beloushi 53', 66'		Al-Shahmeh 85'

Jeddah

21 January 2003

Al-Ittihad (Saudi Arabia)	7 – 0	(Syria) Al-Wahda
Landomar 29' (pen.); Al-Eissa 45'; Noor 63'; Sérgio 80', 83', 90+2'; Idris 90'

Jeddah

==== Group 2 ====
Team	Pld	W	D	L	GF	GA	GD	Pts
(Tunisia) Stade Tunisien	2	1	1	0	4	1	+3	4
(Libya) Olympic Azzaweya	2	1	1	0	2	0	+2	4
(Sudan) Al-Merrikh	2	0	0	2	1	6	−5	0

17 January 2003

Stade Tunisien (Tunisia)	0 – 0	(Libya) Olympic Azzaweya

Jeddah

19 January 2003

Olympic Azzaweya (Libya)	2 – 0	(Sudan) Al-Merrikh
Al-Subai 14', 55'

Jeddah

21 January 2003

Stade Tunisien (Tunisia)	4 – 1	(Sudan) Al-Merrikh
Sellami 14'; Andai 45'; Salhi 78'; Selliti 90'		Jundi Numairi 61'

Jeddah

==== Group 3 ====
Team	Pld	W	D	L	GF	GA	GD	Pts
(Morocco) MAS Fez	2	2	0	0	11	1	+10	6
(Bahrain) Al-Ahli Manama	2	1	1	0	2	0	+2	4
(Palestine) Al-Aqsa	0	0	0	0	0	0	0	0

18 January 2003

MAS Fez (Morocco)	3 – 0	(Bahrain) Al-Ahli Manama
Hassi 50', 75'; Boulissi 90'

Jeddah

22 January 2003

Al-Ahli Manama (Bahrain)	0 – 2	(Morocco) MAS Fez
		Hassi 12' (pen.); Kamatcho 78'

Jeddah

==== Group 4 ====
Team	Pld	W	D	L	GF	GA	GD	Pts
(Saudi Arabia) Al-Ahli	2	2	0	0	6	1	+5	6
(Tunisia) Club Africain	2	1	0	1	3	2	+1	3
(Jordan) [[Al-Hussein Irbed]]	2	0	0	2	0	7	−7	0

18 January 2003

Al-Ahli (Saudi Arabia)	4 – 0	(Jordan) Al-Hussein Irbed
Badra 63' (pen.); Al-Gizani 73'; Al-Meshal 75'; Al-Jahdali 85'

Jeddah

20 January 2003

Al-Hussein Irbed (Jordan)	0 – 3	(Tunisia) Club Africain
		El Taib 34', 82'; Sellimi 85'

Jeddah

22 January 2003

Al-Ahli (Saudi Arabia)	2 – 0	(Tunisia) Club Africain
Al-Meshal 70'; El Moubarki 78' (pen.)

Jeddah

=== Second round ===
==== Group A ====
Team	Pld	W	D	L	GF	GA	GD	Pts
(Saudi Arabia) Al-Ittihad	3	2	1	0	4	1	+3	7
(Tunisia) Stade Tunisien	3	1	1	1	6	5	+1	4
(Kuwait) Al-Qadsia	3	1	0	2	5	8	−3	3
(Libya) Olympic Azzaweya	3	0	2	1	1	2	−1	2

24 January 2003

Al-Ittihad (Saudi Arabia)	0 – 0	(Libya) Olympic Azzaweya

Jeddah
24 January 2003

Stade Tunisien (Tunisia)	5 – 3	(Kuwait) Al-Qadsia
Jaballah 4'; Selliti 33'; Sellami 42'; Daassi 86'; Andai 90'		Neda 31'; Amrane 56'; Saleh 74'

Jeddah

26 January 2003

Al-Ittihad (Saudi Arabia)	3 – 1	(Kuwait) Al-Qadsia
T. Camara 46', 51', 66'		Al-Saqer 26'

Jeddah
26 January 2003

Stade Tunisien (Tunisia)	1 – 1	(Libya) Olympic Azzaweya
Ayari 46'		Al-Zawi 62'

Jeddah

29 January 2003

Al-Qadsia (Kuwait)	1 – 0	(Libya) Olympic Azzaweya
Naser 33'

Jeddah
29 January 2003

Al-Ittihad (Saudi Arabia)	1 – 0	(Tunisia) Stade Tunisien
Sérgio 15'

Jeddah

==== Group B ====
Team	Pld	W	D	L	GF	GA	GD	Pts
(Saudi Arabia) Al-Ahli	3	3	0	0	8	2	+6	9
(Tunisia) Club Africain	3	2	0	1	9	4	+5	6
(Morocco) MAS Fez	3	0	1	2	3	8	−5	1
(Bahrain) Al-Ahli Manama	3	0	1	2	2	8	−6	1

25 January 2003

MAS Fez (Morocco)	1 – 4	(Tunisia) Club Africain
Nasri 64'		Sellimi 6', 61'; Daye 11'; Bouzaiene 28'

Jeddah
25 January 2003

Al-Ahli (Saudi Arabia)	2 – 1	(Bahrain) Al-Ahli Manama
El Moubarki 32'; Al-Gizani 90+1'		Al-Hejeiri 45'

Jeddah

27 January 2003

MAS Fez (Morocco)	1 – 1	(Bahrain) Al-Ahli Manama
Lahrach 2'		Sangoor 38'

Jeddah
27 January 2003

Al-Ahli (Saudi Arabia)	3 – 0	(Tunisia) Club Africain
Al-Jahdali 26'; Al-Shahri 31'; Barakat 77'

Jeddah

30 January 2003

Al-Ahli Manama (Bahrain)	0 – 5	(Tunisia) Club Africain
		Khalfaoui 15'; Bouzaiene 47'; Fathalli 59', 90'; El Taib 80'

Jeddah
30 January 2003

MAS Fez (Morocco)	1 – 3	(Saudi Arabia) Al-Ahli
Lahrach 39'		Al-Gizani 24', 35'; Al-Mohammedi 83'

Jeddah

=== Knock-out stage ===
Semi-finals
18 July 2003 - Cairo
(Saudi Arabia) Ittihad	2
(Tunisia) Club Africain	4
18 July 2003 - Cairo
(Saudi Arabia) Al-Ahli	2
(Tunisia) Stade Tunisien	1

Final
20 July 2003 - Cairo
(Saudi Arabia) Al-Ahli	1
(Tunisia) Club Africain	0

==== Semifinals ====
1 February 2003

Al-Ittihad (Saudi Arabia)	2 – 4	(Tunisia) Club Africain
Zaalani 16' (o.g.); Al-Otaibi 90'		Khalfaoui 7'; Fathalli 42'; Sellimi 55', 60'

Prince Abdullah al-Faisal Stadium, Jeddah

1 February 2003

Al-Ahli (Saudi Arabia)	2 – 1	(Tunisia) Stade Tunisien
Al-Meshal 5'; El Moubarki 21'		Daassi 71'

Prince Abdullah al-Faisal Stadium, Jeddah

==== Third place match ====
3 February 2003

Al-Ittihad (Saudi Arabia)	Not played	(Tunisia) Stade Tunisien

Prince Abdullah al-Faisal Stadium, Jeddah

Third place match not played, Al-Ittihad awarded third place.

==== Final ====
3 February 2003

Al-Ahli (Saudi Arabia)	1 – 0	(Tunisia) Club Africain
Barakat 67'

Prince Abdullah al-Faisal Stadium, Jeddah
Attendance: 27,000

== Winners ==
2002 Prince Faisal bin Fahd Tournament for Arab Clubs
(Saudi Arabia)
Al-Ahli
First title
