= 2004 Coupe de France final =

Final of the 2003–04 edition of the Coupe de France

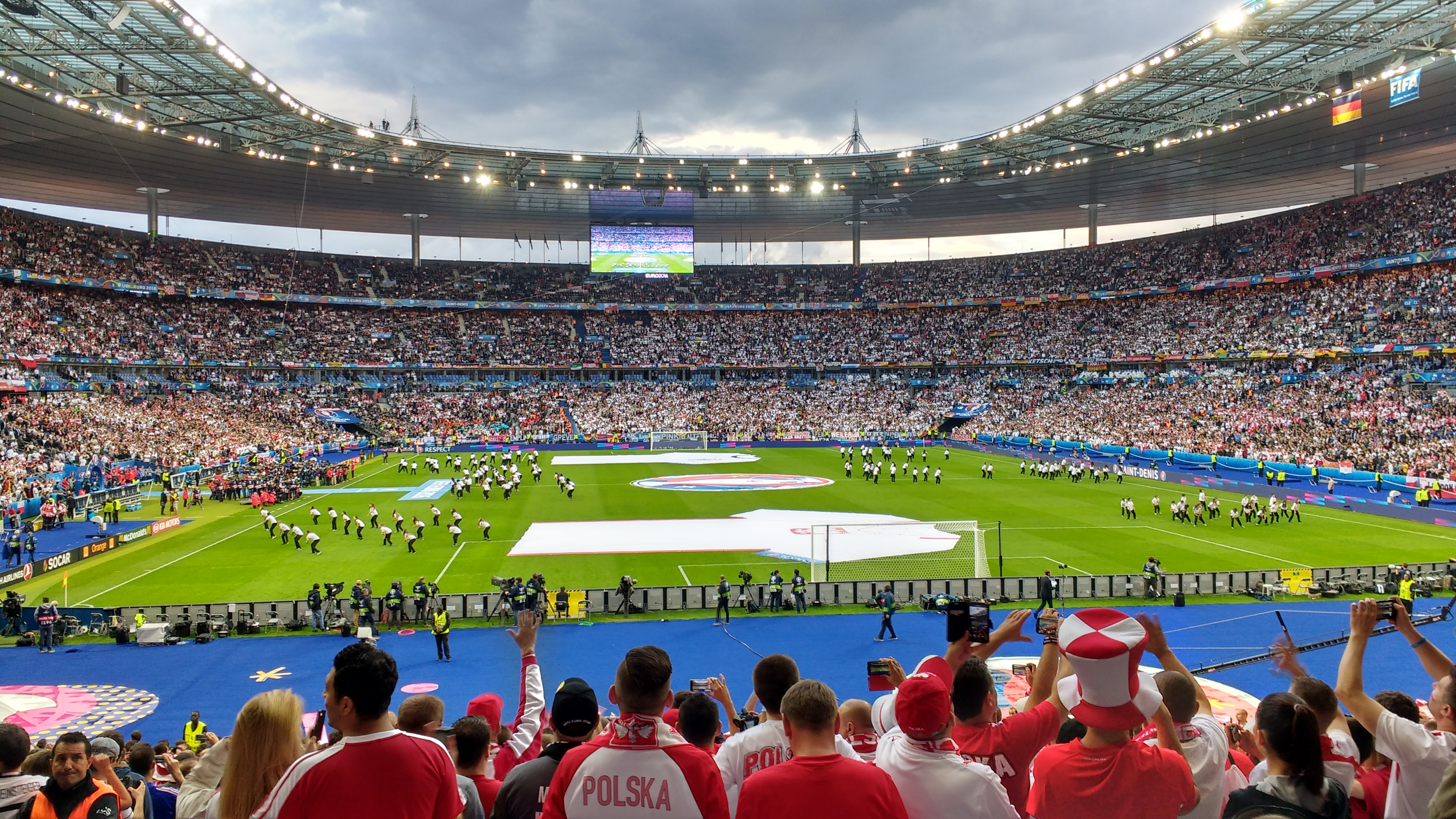
- Event: 2003–04 Coupe de France
Paris Saint-Germain	Châteauroux
1	0
- Date: 29 May 2004
- Venue: Stade de France, Saint-Denis
- Referee: Stéphane Bré
- Attendance: 78,721

The 2004 Coupe de France final was a football match held at Stade de France, Saint-Denis on 29 May 2004, that saw Paris SG defeat LB Châteauroux 1–0 thanks to a goal by Pauleta.

== Road to the final ==
Paris Saint-Germain			Round	Châteauroux
Opponent	H/A	Result	2003–04 Coupe de France	Opponent	H/A	Result
Troyes	H	3–2 (a.e.t.)	Round of 64	Grenoble	A	1–0
Marseille	A	2–1 (a.e.t.)	Round of 32	Valence	A	2–2 (a.e.t.); 5−4 pen.
Bayonne	A	2–0	Round of 16	Créteil	H	2–0
Brive	A	2–1	Quarter-finals	Monaco	A	1–0
Nantes	A	1–1 (a.e.t.); 4−3 pen.	Semi-finals	Dijon	H	2–0

== Match details ==
29 May 2004
20:45

Paris Saint-Germain	1–0	Châteauroux
Pauleta 65'

Stade de France, Saint-Denis
Attendance: 78,721
Referee: Stéphane Bré

PSG:
GK	1	(France) Lionel Letizi
DF	3	(Morocco) Talal El Karkouri
DF	4	(France) José-Karl Pierre-Fanfan
DF	5	(France) Frédéric Déhu (c)
DF	2	(France) Bernard Mendy
MF	6	(Serbia and Montenegro) Branko Bošković	(substituted off) 73'
MF	8	(Albania) Lorik Cana
MF	7	(Cameroon) Modeste M'bami
MF	11	(France) Fabrice Fiorèse
FW	10	(Serbia and Montenegro) Danijel Ljuboja	(substituted off) 84'
FW	9	(Portugal) Pauleta	(substituted off) 89'
Substitutes:
MF	13	(Tunisia) Selim Benachour	(substituted on) 73'
MF	14	(France) Romain Rocchi	(substituted on) 84'
FW	15	(France) Alioune Touré	(substituted on) 89'
Manager:
(Bosnia and Herzegovina) Vahid Halilhodžić Assistant Referees: Fourth Official:

CHÂTEAUROUX:
GK	1	(France) Rodolphe Roche
DF	2	(France) Jimmy Algerino
DF	3	(Tunisia) Wissam El Bekri	(substituted off) 76'
DF	4	(France) Eddy Viator
DF	5	(France) Teddy Bertin (c)
MF	6	(France) Karim Fradin
MF	11	(Mali) Djibril Sidibé
MF	8	(France) Sébastien Roudet
MF	9	(France) David Vandenbossche
FW	10	(France) Armindo Ferreira
FW	7	(Ivory Coast) Marc-Éric Gueï
Substitutes:
FW	12	(Madagascar) Johann Paul	(substituted on) 76'
Manager:
(France) Victor Zvunka

== See also ==
- Coupe de France 2003-04
