= Armindo Ferreira =

French footballer (born 1976)

Personal information
- Date of birth: 31 January 1976 (age 50)
- Place of birth: Niort, France
- Height: 1.80 m (5 ft 11 in)
- Position: Midfielder

Senior career*
Years	Team	Apps	(Gls)
1991–1999	Chamois Niortais	164	(15)
1999–2007	Châteauroux	237	(20)
- * Club domestic league appearances and goals

Armindo Ferreira (born 31 January 1976) is a French former professional footballer who played as a midfielder. He participated in the Coupe de France Final 2004 with Châteauroux. He played in 343 Ligue 2 matches, 24 Coupe de France matches and one UEFA Cup match. He has managed the Châteauroux reserves.
