= Gaël Hiroux =

French footballer (born 1980)

Personal information
- Date of birth: 3 August 1980 (age 46)
- Place of birth: Versailles, France
- Height: 1.78 m (5 ft 10 in)
- Position: Forward

Youth career
- Trappes
- INF Clairefontaine
- Paris Saint-Germain

Senior career*
Years	Team	Apps	(Gls)
1997–2002	Paris Saint-Germain B		
2000–2002	Paris Saint-Germain	1	(0)
2001	→ Martigues (loan)	12	(2)
2001–2002	→ Martigues (loan)	12	(0)
2002	→ RFC Liège (loan)		
2002–2003	Wasquehal	19	(1)
2003–2004	Red Star		
2004	Pontivy		
2004–2006	Poissy		
2006–2007	ASA Issy		
2008	Boulogne-Billancourt		

International career
- France U15
- France U17
- France U21
- * Club domestic league appearances and goals

Gaël Hiroux (born 3 August 1980) is a French former professional footballer who played as a forward. He was a member of the France squad that played at the 2001 Mediterranean Games, scoring once against San Marino. At club level, he notably scored two goals in six games to help Paris Saint-Germain win the 2001 UEFA Intertoto Cup.

== After football ==
Hiroux retired from football in 2008 and later became a commercial agent.

== Honours ==
Paris Saint-Germain U19

- Coupe Gambardella runner-up: 1997–98

Paris Saint-Germain

- UEFA Intertoto Cup: 2001

France U21

- Mediterranean Games bronze medal: 2001
