= Vitangelo Spadavecchia =

Italian footballer (born 1982)

Personal information
- Full name: Vitangelo Spadavecchia
- Date of birth: 25 November 1982 (age 43)
- Place of birth: Molfetta, Italy
- Height: 1.92 m (6 ft 4 in)
- Position: Goalkeeper

Youth career
- 1997–2000: Andria
- 2000–2002: Bari

Senior career*
Years	Team	Apps	(Gls)
2002–2009	Bari	5	(0)
2004–2005	→ Sambenedettese (loan)	14	(0)
2006–2007	→ Pescara (loan)	15	(0)
2007	→ Catania (loan)	0	(0)
2008–2009	→ Sorrento (loan)	19	(0)
2010–2011	Andria	56	(0)
2015	Atletico Mola	N/A	(N/A)
2015–2016	Altamura	N/A	(N/A)
Total		109	(0)

International career^{‡}
2001–2003	Italy U-20	17	(0)
- * Club domestic league appearances and goals as of 22 May 2012 ‡ National team caps and goals as of 30 June 2016

Vitangelo Spadavecchia (born 25 November 1982) is an Italian former professional footballer who played as a goalkeeper.

== Club career ==
=== Bari ===
Spadavecchia joined Bari in mid-2000.

Spadavecchia joined Pescara on 25 August 2006.

=== Andria ===
In December 2009 Bari released Spadavecchia who played as a backup; he joined third tier club Andria in January 2010.

=== Match fixing scandal ===
On 11 October 2011 Spadavecchia was banned 3 years and 3 months for match fixing (until 1 January 2015). The suspected match was on 5 April 2009, Juve Stabia 1–0 Sorrento. His former teammate Cristian Biancone also banned, along with Roberto Amodio (sports director of Juve Stabia) and Antonino Castellano (chairman of Sorrento). Spadavecchia appealed twice, but dismissed by the Corte di Giustizia Federale of FIGC and the Tribunale Nazionale di Arbitrato per lo Sport of CONI.

=== Return to football ===
In mid-2015 he was signed by amateur side Atletico Mola. He played at least one game for the team in Eccellenza Apulia league, against Mesagne. In December 2015 he joined the local side of Altamura.

== International career ==
Spadavecchia capped 17 times for Italy national under-20 football team, the ladder team between U19 and U21. Spadavecchia was part of the U20 squad in 2001 Mediterranean Games. The team won a silver medal. However, Spadavecchia was an unused bench for the whole tournament.
