= Selim Benachour =

Former Tunisian footballer and coach (born 1981)

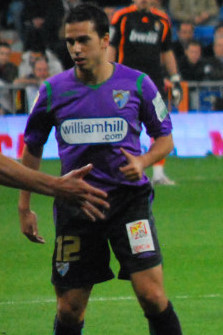
- Benachour playing for Málaga in 2010

Personal information
- Full name: Slim Ben-Achour
- Date of birth: 8 September 1981 (age 45)
- Place of birth: Paris, France
- Height: 1.70 m (5 ft 7 in)
- Position: Attacking midfielder

Youth career
- 1995–1998: INF Clairefontaine
- 1995–2001: Paris Saint-Germain

Senior career*
Years	Team	Apps	(Gls)
2001–2005	Paris Saint-Germain	28	(1)
2001–2002	→ Martigues (loan)	28	(1)
2003	→ Troyes (loan)	9	(2)
2005–2006	Vitória Guimarães	25	(4)
2006–2008	Rubin Kazan	23	(3)
2008–2009	Al Qadsia	25	(3)
2009–2010	Málaga	22	(0)
2011–2012	Marítimo	33	(5)
2012–2014	APOEL	38	(3)
2015	Mumbai City	11	(1)
2016–2018	FC Martigues	15	(2)
Total		257	(25)

International career
2002–2010	Tunisia	44	(2)

Managerial career
- 2016–2018: FC Martigues (youth)
- 2018: Club Africain (assistant)
- 2018–2019: Foresta Suceava
- 2020: Olimpia Grudziądz
- 2020–2021: Oldham Athletic (under-18s)
- 2021–2022: Oldham Athletic (caretaker)
- 2022–2024: Tunisia (assistant)
- 2024–2025: Tunisia U20
- 2025: Chania
Medal record
Men's football
Representing Tunisia
Africa Cup of Nations
Winner	2004 Tunisia
- * Club domestic league appearances and goals

Selim Benachour (Arabic: سليم بن عاشور, Salīm bin ʻĀshūr; born Slim Ben-Achour on 8 September 1981) is a French born Tunisian football coach and former professional player who played as an attacking midfielder.

Born in France, he represented France at youth international level before playing for Tunisia at senior international level.

== Club career ==
=== Paris Saint-Germain ===
Born and brought up in Paris, Selim Benachour learned to play his trade at the Paris Saint-Germain academy. Benachour began his professional club career with Paris Saint-Germain in 2001 and stayed in the club until 2005.

After his two loan transfers, he went back to PSG after this, playing on and off for them over the next two seasons. Overall he earned 28 caps for his childhood club, scoring one goal.

With PSG, he appeared in 28 league matches and scored a goal, alongside winning the Coupe de France in 2004.

=== Out on loan from PSG ===
He was given twice on loan from Paris Saint-Germain to Martigues in 2001–2002 and Troyes in 2003. He was sent to French Division 2 club Martigues on a season long loan spell. He played regularly for the Martigues first team, scoring one goal in 28 appearances. Next season he was sent on loan to Ligue 2 side ES Troyes AC, who had just narrowly avoided bankruptcy and were just trying to survive for the time being. Benachour had trouble getting into their team, making 9 appearances over the season, scoring twice.

=== Vitoria ===
In 2005, he left France and moved to Portugal, signing with Vitória Guimarães, where he enjoyed one successful season at the club.

=== Rubin Kazan ===
The next season, he signed a contract with the Russian side Rubin Kazan, where he played for two seasons and appeared in 23 league matches, scoring 3 goals. He was in Kazan's 2006 La Manga Cup winning squad.

=== Al Qadsia ===
After two seasons with Kazan, he moved to Kuwait and signed for Kuwaiti Premier League side Al Qadsia and played there until 2009. With Qadsia, he won the 2008–09 Kuwaiti Premier League.

=== Malaga ===
In 2009, he signed with the Spanish La Liga side Málaga. On 13 September 2010 he was not registered to play in La Liga and was released by the club, with one year still left on his contract.

=== Maritimo ===
On 21 January 2011, he returned to Portugal and signed a contract with the Marítimo until the end of the 2011–2012 season.

=== APOEL ===
On 16 June 2012, Benachour signed a two-year contract with the Cypriot club APOEL. On 23 August 2012, he scored his first goal with APOEL in a Europa League play-off round match against Neftchi Baku in Dalga Arena, equalising the score in the 83rd minute, in a match which ended with 1–1 draw. He became a champion with APOEL after helping his club to win the 2012–13 Cypriot First Division. During the 2013–14 season, he appeared in two 2013–14 UEFA Europa League group stage matches for APOEL and won all the titles in Cyprus, the Cypriot League, the Cypriot Cup and the Cypriot Super Cup.

=== Mumbai City ===
On 28 July 2015, he signed for Indian Super League club Mumbai City FC managed by his former teammate Nicolas Anelka. With Mumbai, he appeared in 11 matches with 3 assists and 1 goal, as the club finished 6th in the 2015 Indian Super League.

=== Martigues ===
After the end of his stint with Mumbai, he came back to France in 2016 and signed with Championnat National 2 side FC Martigues. From 2016 to 2018, he appeared in 15 league matches with Martigues, scoring 2 goals.

== International career ==
Benachour played for France national teams at youth level from under-15 to under-20. In June 2001, after playing the Toulon tournament with Raymond Domenech as a coach, he refused to play the under-20 World Cup for France.

He made his international debut on 11 January 2002 against Cameroon in a friendly match which ended as their 1–0 defeat. Between 2002 and 2010, he earned 44 caps for Tunisia and scored 2 goals.

He was widely considered one of Tunisia's best players, an elegant playmaker with range of passing and great vision, and played for Tunisia's national squad at the 2002 World Cup. However, he was not included in the squad for the 2006 World Cup in Germany, in which Tunisia were knocked out in the first round. He was part of the national squad that emerged as the champions of the 2004 African Cup of Nations, defeating Morocco.

== Managerial career ==
Overall, he made over 250 appearances at senior level throughout his career before retiring and in 2016, Benachour became the head coach at Martigues FC U17, where he won the Provincial Cup and then came runners-up in the league before moving up to the U19 team. Later he joined Foresta Suceava in Romania as manager and guided the club to a fifth-place finish.

He then occupied the post of technical director as well as briefly the head coach role at Olimpia Grudziądz in Poland's top division.

Moving to England, the UEFA A licence holder Benachour took up the position of under-18s manager at Oldham Athletic in September 2020.

He became caretaker first team head coach of Oldham Athletic on 24 November 2021, following the departure of Keith Curle.

== Career statistics ==
=== International goals ===
Scores and results list Tunisia's goal tally first.

No.	Date	Venue	Opponent	Score	Result	Competition
1.	1 February 2004	Stade Olympique de Radès, Radès	Guinea	1–0	1–1	2004 African Nations Cup
2.	26 January 2006	Stade de l'Amitié, Harras El-Hedoud Stadium, Alexandria	South Africa	2–0	2–0	2006 African Nations Cup

== Managerial statistics ==
Managerial record by team and tenure
Team	From	To	Record					Ref.
Team	From	To	P	W	D	L	Win %	Ref.
Foresta Suceava	15 August 2018	8 April 2019	20	8	6	6	40.0	
Olimpia Grudziądz	1 July 2020	31 July 2020	6	0	2	4	0.0	
Oldham Athletic	24 November 2021	22 January 2022	9	1	3	5	11.1	
Tunisia U20	11 July 2024	1 January 2025	4	2	0	2	50.0	
Total			39	11	11	17	28.2	

== Honours ==
=== Country ===
Tunisia under-21

- Mediterranean Games: 2001

Tunisia

- Africa Cup of Nations: 2004

=== Club ===
Paris Saint-Germain

- Coupe de France: 2004

Qadsia

- Kuwaiti Premier League: 2008–09

APOEL

- Cypriot First Division: 2012–13, 2013–14
- Cypriot Cup: 2013–14
- Cypriot Super Cup: 2013

== Personal life ==
Benachour was born in Paris, France, and is multilingual. He speaks fluent French, English, Spanish and Portuguese.
