= Achraf Khalfaoui =

Tunisian footballer (born 1980)

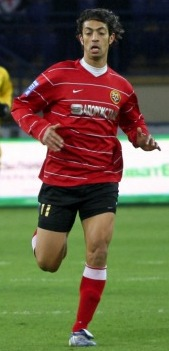
- Achraf Khalfaoui

Personal information
- Full name: Mohamed Achraf Khalfaoui
- Date of birth: 24 October 1980 (age 46)
- Place of birth: Tunisia
- Height: 1.82 m (6 ft 0 in)
- Position: Midfielder

Senior career*
Years	Team	Apps	(Gls)
2005–2008	Club Africain		
2005–2008	Stade Tunisien		
2008–2009	UD Leiria		
2009–2010	Stade Tunisien		
2011–2013	FC Metalurh Zaporizhzhia	48	(5)
- * Club domestic league appearances and goals

Mohamed Achraf Khalfaoui (Arabic: اشرف الخلفاوي; born 24 October 1980) is a Tunisian former footballer who played as a midfielder.

== Early life ==
Khalfaoui represented Tunisia internationally at youth level, helping the team win the 2001 Mediterranean Games.

== Career ==
Khalfaoui played for Saudi Arabian side Al-Ettifaq FC, where he was described as "pinned hopes on him that he would help the first football team achieve a good position in the league, but Al-Khalafawi did not appear at the level that satisfied the ambitions of the technical and administrative staff and Al-Ittifaq fans".

== Style of play ==
Khalfaoui mainly operated as a midfielder and was known for his versatility.
