= Marco Mancinelli =

Italian footballer

Personal information
- Date of birth: 31 January 1982 (age 44)
- Place of birth: Recanati, Italy
- Height: 1.75 m (5 ft 9 in)
- Position: Midfielder

Youth career
- Ascoli

Senior career*
Years	Team	Apps	(Gls)
1999–2000	Ascoli	2	(0)
2000–2009	Verona	97	(0)
2002–2004	→ Martina (loan)	47	(4)
2005	→ Vicenza (co-ownership)	0	(0)
2007	→ Ancona (loan)	9	(0)
2009–2010	Lecco	10	(0)

International career
2001–2002	Italy U20	12	(0)

Managerial career
- 2015–2017: Villa Musone
- 2024: Sambenedettese
- 2025: Sambenedettese (caretaker)
- * Club domestic league appearances and goals

Marco Mancinelli (born 31 January 1982) is a former Italian footballer.

== Club career ==
Born in Recanati, Marche, Mancinelli started his career at Ascoli Calcio 1898. He was signed by Hellas Verona F.C. in 2000 for its reserve. he capped for Italy national under-20 football team from 2001 to 2002, winning 2002 Under-20 Four Nations Tournament and finished as the second in 2001 Mediterranean Games. In July 2002 he left on loan to Martina and the loan was renewed in 2003. he wore no.26 shirt for Verona in 2004–05 Serie B. Mancinelli left for Vicenza Calcio in June 2005 in a direct swap with Gilberto Zanoletti (also in co-ownership), both tagged for €475,000. However, on 31 August, Verona bought back Mancinelli and sold back Zanoletti, both for free, as well as bought half of Julien Rantier's contract for €270,000. The direct swap made both club had a player selling revenue of €950,000 (documented in 2005–06 financial year on Vicenza side) and a player acquire cost which would amortize in the rest of the new player contract as worse VAT. On the Verona side, Mancinelli's new contract was amortized from 2005 to 2009, at an average cost of €237,500 per season. In January 2007, he left for Ancona on a temporary deal.

== Coaching career ==
On 28 November 2025, following the departure of head coach Ottavio Palladini, Mancinelli was appointed interim head coach of Sambenedettese. He left his role on 3 December 2025, departing from the club altogether.
