= Lotfi Sellami =

Tunisian footballer

Personal information
- Date of birth: 26 December 1978 (age 47)
- Place of birth: Kairouan, Tunisia
- Position: Defender

Senior career*
Years	Team	Apps	(Gls)
1998–2001	JS Kairouan		
2001–2007	Étoile du Sahel		
2007–2009	Stade Gabèsien		
2009–2010	JS Kairouan		

International career
2000–2004	Tunisia	2	(1)

Managerial career
- 2015–2016: Al-Hazm
- 2016–2018: Hajer Club
- 2018: AS Gabès
- 2019: CS Hammam-Lif
- * Club domestic league appearances and goals

Lotfi Sellami (born 26 December 1978) is a retired Tunisian football defender and later manager.
