= Roberto Cardinale =

Italian professional football player

Personal information
- Date of birth: 12 June 1981 (age 45)
- Place of birth: Pollena Trocchia, Italy
- Height: 1.82 m (6 ft 0 in)
- Position: Defender

Team information
- Current team: USD Scalea

Senior career*
Years	Team	Apps	(Gls)
1998–2003	Salernitana	64	(0)
2003	→ Reggina (loan)	0	(0)
2004–2005	Perugia	1	(0)
2005	→ Spezia (loan)	15	(0)
2005–2006	Martina	30	(0)
2006–2009	Salernitana	71	(3)
2009–2010	Potenza	17	(0)
2010–2011	Gela	32	(2)
2011–2013	Avellino	32	(3)
2013–2014	Melfi	30	(3)
2014–2015	Aversa Normanna	14	(0)
2015–2016	Agropoli	30	(1)
2016–2017	Polisportiva Santa Maria	?	(?)
2017–	USD Scalea	?	(?)

International career
2000–2002	Italy U-20	19	(1)
2002	Italy U-21	3	(0)
- * Club domestic league appearances and goals as of 15 January 2018

Roberto Cardinale (born 12 June 1981) is an Italian professional football player currently playing for USD Scalea 1912.

He played one game in the Serie A in the 2003/04 season for Perugia Calcio.

After the bankrupt of Gela, he signed a 2-year contract with Avellino.
