= Loïc Vincent =

French footballer (born 1980)

Personal information
- Date of birth: 26 January 1980 (age 46)
- Place of birth: Béthune, France
- Height: 1.82 m (5 ft 11 1/2 in)
- Position: Goalkeeper

Senior career*
Years	Team	Apps	(Gls)
2001–2002	Naval 1º de Maio	23	(0)
2002–2003	Stade Beaucairois		
2003–2004	FC Champagne Sports (Switzerland)		
2004–2006	Nîmes Olympique		
2006–2007	Stade Lavallois		
2007–2008	La Vitréenne		
2008–	AFC Compiègne		
- * Club domestic league appearances and goals as of 17:17, 23 November 2009 (UTC)

Loïc Vincent (born 26 January 1980) is a French professional football player.

Loïc Vincent spent time at the INF Clairefontaine academy, before joining Rennes.

Between 2008 and 2010, he plays in the Championnat de France amateur for AFC Compiègne.

He played on the professional level in Liga de Honra for Associação Naval 1º de Maio.
