= Nicolas Sahnoun =

French retired footballer (born 1980)

Personal information
- Date of birth: 3 September 1980 (age 46)
- Place of birth: Bordeaux, France
- Height: 1.88 m (6 ft 2 in)
- Position: Midfielder

Youth career
- 1997–2000: Bordeaux

Senior career*
Years	Team	Apps	(Gls)
2000–2003	Bordeaux	34	(1)
2000–2001	→ Fulham (loan)	7	(0)
2002	→ Ajaccio (loan)	14	(1)
2004–2005	Almería	41	(5)
2005–2006	Brest	15	(6)
2007–2008	Dijon	39	(3)
2008–2010	Montpellier	5	(0)
2009–2010	→ Racing Ferrol (loan)	19	(0)
2010–2013	Lège-Cap-Ferret		
Total		174	(16)
- * Club domestic league appearances and goals

Nicolas Sahnoun (born 3 September 1980) is a French retired footballer who played as a midfielder.

== Football career ==
Born in Bordeaux of Algerian descent, Sahnoun emerged through local FC Girondins de Bordeaux's youth ranks, but appeared sparingly for its first team during his spell as a senior, also being loaned twice: he helped English club Fulham achieve promotion to the Premier League for the first time ever, repeating the feat back in his country with Ligue 2's AC Ajaccio.

In January 2004, aged 23, Sahnoun moved to Spain, after signing with Segunda División side UD Almería, where he would play for one and a half seasons. Subsequently, he returned to France, spending three years – one-and-a-half apiece – with Stade Brestois 29 and Dijon FCO in the second level.

Sahnoun achieved his third second tier promotion in the 2008–09 campaign, with Montpellier HSC, but appeared rarely for the Rolland Courbis-led team (also his manager at Bordeaux) and left for Racing de Ferrol in the Spanish Segunda División B for one season, on loan.

== Personal life ==
Sahnoun's father, Omar, was also a footballer and a midfielder. He too played for Bordeaux.
