= David Grondin =

French footballer (born 1980)

Personal information
- Full name: David Roland Clément Grondin
- Date of birth: 8 May 1980 (age 46)
- Place of birth: Juvisy-sur-Orge, Essonne, France
- Height: 1.75 m (5 ft 9 in)
- Position: Left-back

Youth career
- 1994–1998: Saint-Étienne

Senior career*
| Years | Team | Apps | (Gls) |
| 1998–2003 | Arsenal | 1 | (0) |
| 1999–2000 | → Saint-Étienne (loan) | 0 | (0) |
| 2000–2001 | → Cannes (loan) | 31 | (0) |
| 2001–2002 | → Beveren (loan) | 29 | (3) |
| 2003 | → Dunfermline Athletic (loan) | 13 | (0) |
| 2003–2004 | Dunfermline Athletic | 14 | (0) |
| 2004–2005 | Brest | 35 | (2) |
| 2005–2008 | Mouscron | 78 | (4) |
| 2008–2009 | KV Mechelen | 14 | (0) |
| 2009–2010 | Mons | 33 | (1) |
| 2010 | Brussels | 9 | (0) |
| Total | | 257 | (10) |
- * Club domestic league appearances and goals

David Roland Clément Grondin (born 8 May 1980) is a French former professional footballer who played as a left-back. He featured for Arsenal as well as several French and Belgian clubs.

== Career ==
Grondin, featuring as a winger, played in 1994 for Saint-Étienne in his youth career. He then left Les Verts to join Arsenal in 1998 for £500,000. While at the Gunners, Grondin was loaned back out to Saint Étienne in 1999. He also had loan spells at Cannes in 2000 as well as Beveren of the Belgian First Division A a season later. Grondin made four appearances for Arsenal in all competitions. He played one Premiership match for Arsenal, starting in a 0–0 draw against Liverpool in January 1999.

After leaving Arsenal, Grondin joined Scottish side Dunfermline Athletic, initially on loan before signing permanently in 2003. At Dunfermline, he scored once, against Rangers in the Scottish Cup. While at Dunfermline he also played in the 2004 Scottish Cup Final, where he received a runners-up medal. In 2004 he moved to Ligue 2 club Brest. On 6 August 2009, he signed for Mons from KV Mechelen, staying for the following season. He then made the switch to F.C. Brussels, where he ended his footballing career.
