= Cyril Guyot =

French footballer (born 1980)

Personal information
- Date of birth: 4 January 1980 (age 46)
- Place of birth: Gournay-en-Bray, France
- Height: 1.83 m (6 ft 0 in)
- Position: Defender

Team information
- Current team: FC Dieppe

Senior career*
| Years | Team | Apps | (Gls) |
| 2001–2002 | Le Havre AC | 3 | (0) |
| 2002–2003 | CS Louhans-Cuiseaux | | |
| 2003–2004 | AS Cannes | | |
| 2005–2008 | FC Dieppe | | |
| 2008–2009 | Pau FC | | |
| 2009–2015 | Les Herbiers VF | | |
- FC Dieppe
- * Club domestic league appearances and goals as of 21:59, 25 November 2009 (UTC)

Cyril Guyot (French: [siʁil ɡɥijo]; born 4 January 1980) is a French professional football player. Currently, he plays in the Championnat de France amateur for FC Dieppe.

He played on the professional level in Ligue 2 for Le Havre AC.
