= Ludovic Delporte =

French footballer (born 1980)

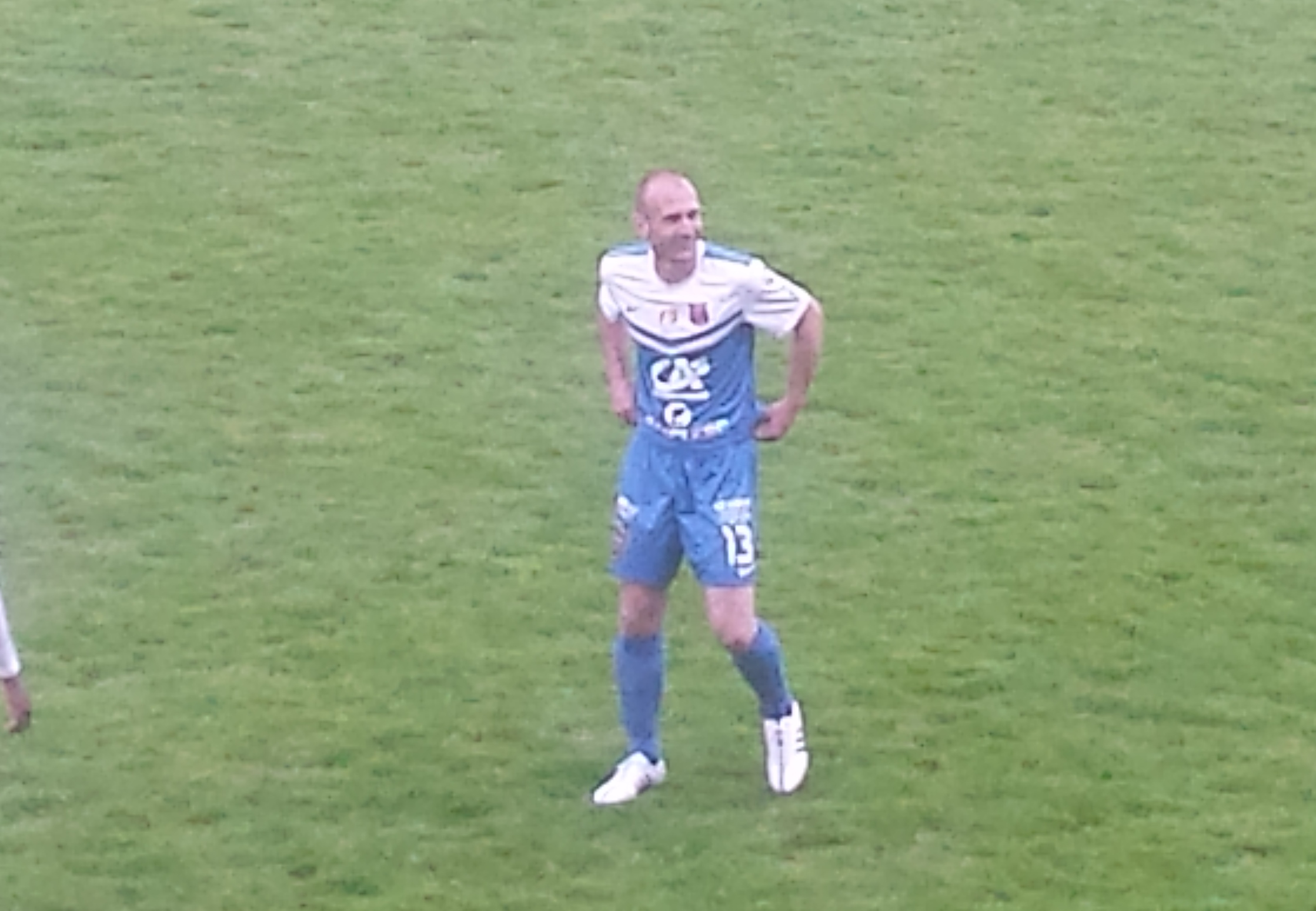
- Delporte in 2015

Personal information
- Date of birth: 6 February 1980 (age 46)
- Place of birth: Sainte-Catherine, France
- Height: 1.77 m (5 ft 10 in)
- Position: Midfielder

Youth career
- 1995–1998: Lens

Senior career*
Years	Team	Apps	(Gls)
1998–2002	Lens	7	(0)
2000–2001	→ Laval (loan)	36	(2)
2002	→ Racing Ferrol (loan)	19	(3)
2002–2004	Albacete	43	(2)
2004–2010	Osasuna	88	(3)
2010–2011	Gimnàstic	10	(0)
2011–2012	Angers	13	(1)
2015	Arras	19	(1)
Total		235	(12)
- * Club domestic league appearances and goals

Ludovic Delporte (born 6 February 1980) is a French former professional footballer who played as a midfielder.

Having played professionally in Spain (nine years, mainly with Osasuna) and in his own country (four), his later career was blighted by injuries.

== Career ==
Delporte was born in Sainte-Catherine, Pas-de-Calais. After an unassuming three-and-a-half-year spell at RC Lens which included a loan to Ligue 2 club Stade Lavallois, he moved, in January 2002, to Spanish Segunda División team Racing de Ferrol – still on loan – helping Albacete Balompié to achieve top-flight promotion the following season.

For the 2004–05 season, Delporte joined CA Osasuna, being an important attacking element in his first two years, including 27 games with three goals in the second as the Navarrese tied a best ever fourth-place in La Liga. In 2004–05's Copa del Rey final he started against Real Betis, setting up John Aloisi for the 1–1 equaliser (eventual 2–1 loss after extra time).

However, subsequently, Delporte would be severely hindered by injuries, totalling little more than 30 league appearances in four years, none whatsoever in the 2009–10 campaign. He was released in August 2010, aged 30.

Delporte stayed in Spain in August 2010, signing for second-tier Gimnàstic de Tarragona. After another season marred by physical problems he severed his ties to the Catalans, retiring shortly after.

On 20 December 2011, Delporte returned to active and signed a six-month deal with Angers SCO in his country's division two.
