= Ahmed Khenchil =

Tunisian footballer

Personal information
- Full name: Ahmed Khenchil
- Date of birth: February 27, 1982 (age 44)
- Place of birth: Tunisia
- Height: 1.80 m (5 ft 11 in)
- Position: Midfielder

Team information
- Current team: Olomby

Ahmed Khenchil (Arabic: أحمد خنشيل; born February 27, 1982) is a Tunisian footballer who played as a midfielder for the Libyan Premier League side Olomby.
