= Ümit Aydın =

Turkish footballer

Ümit Aydın (born January 16, 1980) is a Turkish retired footballer who last played for Tepecikspor. Born in Istanbul, Turkey, he played defensive and center midfield. Standing at 183 cm. He played for Galatasaray, Adanaspor, Beşiktaş, Ankaraspor, Antalyaspor, Eskişehirspor, Kayserispor, Istanbulspor and now Bursaspor.

== Honours ==
- Galatasaray
  - UEFA Super Cup: 1 (2000)
