= Simonluca Agazzone =

Italian footballer (1981–2020)

Personal information
- Date of birth: 23 July 1981
- Place of birth: Borgomanero, Italy
- Date of death: 1 October 2020 (aged 39)
- Place of death: Carpignano Sesia, Italy
- Height: 1.78 m (5 ft 10 in)
- Position: Midfielder

Team information
- Current team: AS Sportiva

Youth career
- 1997–2000: Milan

Senior career*
| Years | Team | Apps | (Gls) |
| 2000–2001 | SPAL | 24 | (0) |
| 2001–2002 | Monza | 17 | (1) |
| 2002–2003 | Spezia | 18 | (0) |
| 2003–2004 | Carrarese | 27 | (2) |
| 2004–2005 | Novara | 25 | (1) |
| 2005 | Spezia | 4 | (0) |
| 2006–2007 | Portosummaga | 29 | (1) |
| 2007–2008 | Südtirol | 12 | (0) |
| 2008–2009 | Legnano | 15 | (1) |
| 2009–2010 | Casale | 27 | (4) |
| 2010–2011 | Baveno Calcio | 27 | (5) |
| 2011–2012 | Calcio Marano | 13 | (1) |
| 2012–2013 | Borgovercelli Calcio | 12 | (0) |
| 2013–2014 | ASD Suno | 22 | (0) |
| 2014–2015 | Virtus Cusio | 28 | (3) |

International career
| 1997–1998 | Italy U-16 | 10 | (2) |
| 1999–2000 | Italy U-18 | 6 | (0) |
- * Club domestic league appearances and goals

Simonluca Agazzone (23 July 1981 – 1 October 2020) was an Italian professional footballer.

== Death ==
Agazzone died on 1 October 2020 in Carpignano Sesia following a car crash, at the age of 39. Another footballer, 32-year-old Matteo Ravetto, also died in the crash. Before that he played for several third division clubs.
