= Bouabid Bouden =

Moroccan footballer (born 1982)

Personal information
- Full name: Bouabid Bouden
- Date of birth: 1 February 1982 (age 44)
- Place of death: Rabat, Morocco
- Height: 1.77 m (5 ft 10 in)
- Position: Forward

Youth career
- FAR de Rabat

Senior career*
Years	Team	Apps	(Gls)
1998–2005	Lens		
2002–2003	→ Beauvais (loan)		
2005	→ Al Ahli (loan)		
2005–2006	Odense Boldklub		
2006–2012	Kawkab Marrakech		
2012–2013	COD Meknès		

International career^{‡}
2002–2005	Morocco	3	(1)
- * Club domestic league appearances and goals as of 23 June 2019 ‡ National team caps and goals as of 23 June 2019 (UTC)

Bouabid Bouden (born 1 February 1982 in Rabat) is a Moroccan footballer.

Bouden has played for Kawkab Marrakech, Odense Boldklub and French team RC Lens. He also played on loan for AS Beauvais Oise in Ligue 2.

He was part of the Moroccan 2004 Olympic football team, which exited in the first round, finishing third in group D behind group winners Iraq and runners-up Costa Rica. In total Bouden has been capped 7 times for the Moroccan national team.
