= Mickaël Pontal =

French footballer (born 1980)

Personal information
- Date of birth: 30 April 1980 (age 46)
- Place of birth: Guilherand-Granges, France
- Height: 1.83 m (6 ft 0 in)
- Position: Defender

Youth career
- 1997–2004: Saint-Étienne

Senior career*
Years	Team	Apps	(Gls)
1998–2004	Saint-Étienne	11	(0)
2004–2005	ASOA Valence		
2005	Stade Saint-Raphaël		
2006	Cannes		
2007–2008	AFC Compiègne		
2008–2010	Hyères FC		
- Andrézieux-Bouthéon FC

Managerial career
- 2021–2013: Andrézieux-Bouthéon FC B
- 2013–2014: Andrézieux-Bouthéon FC U19
- 2013–214: Savigneux
- 2014–2015: Louhans-Csx
- 2017–2019: Feurs
- 2020–2022: Veauche
- * Club domestic league appearances and goals

Mickaël Pontal (born 30 April 1980) is a French football manager and former player. A defender, he played 132 matches and won seven trophies across different leagues. He played at the professional level in Ligue 1 and Ligue 2 for Saint-Étienne. He also played in Valence, St Raphaël, Cannes, Compiègne, Hyères, Andrézieux before starting a coaching career in Andrézieux, Savigneux-Montbrison and Louhans-Cuiseaux.

== Playing career ==
Pontal started his professional football career at Saint-Étienne (also known as ASSE) in the 1997–98 season. He played for the club between 1997 until 2004 in different divisions and scoring 7 goals. In between this time, he moved for one season in 2002 to Angers to get more playing time.

In the 2004–05 season, he was loaned to ASOA Valence in the National Ligue where he stayed for one year.

In the 2005–06 season, he played for Cannes, making 36 appearances before moving to Saint-Raphaël for the rest of the 2006–07 season. In 2007–08 season he played for Compiègne and moved to Hyères from 2008 till 2010 making 55 appearances for the club.

His last professional club was Andrézieux in 2010 where he retired 2012.

== Coaching career ==
Pontal started his coaching career at Andrézieux coaching the B and Under 19 teams between 2012 and 2013. He then moved to coach Savigneux for a short spell in 2014 before moving to Louhans as head coach for the 2014–15 season. He returned to coach the Under 17 team at AS Saint-Étienne before moving to Feurs for a three-year coaching role. In 2019, he left Feurs to Veauche. He left the coaching role at Veache at the end of 2022.
