= Georgios Kyriazis =

Greek footballer (born in 1980)

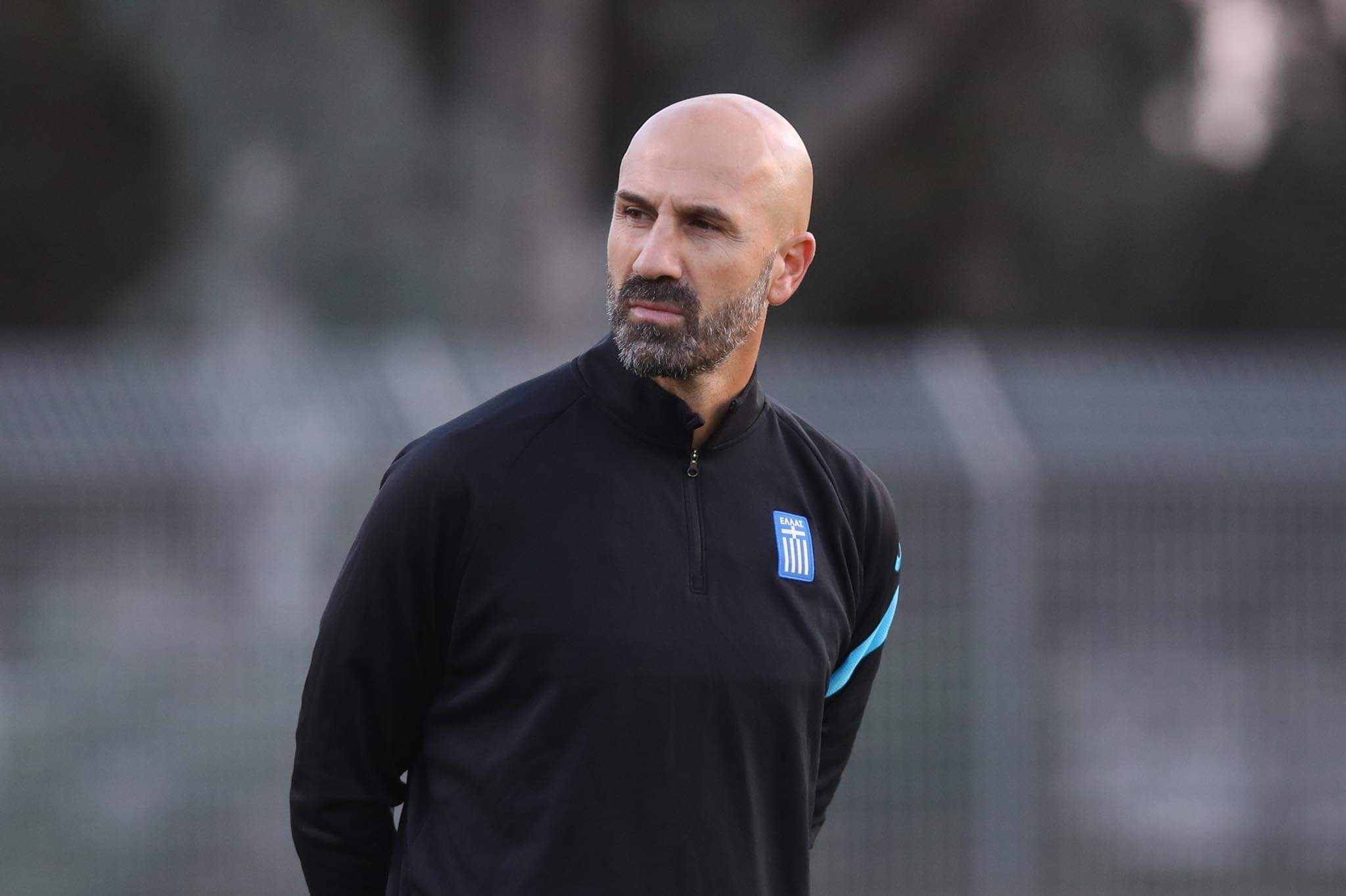

Personal information
- Date of birth: 28 February 1980 (age 46)
- Place of birth: Thessaloniki, Greece
- Height: 1.88 m (6 ft 2 in)
- Position: Defender

Youth career
- 1990–1995: Georgios Koudas Academy
- 1995–1996: Makedonikos Litis

Senior career*
Years	Team	Apps	(Gls)
1996–2003	Iraklis	134	(9)
2003	Catania	13	(1)
2003–2005	Arezzo	28	(1)
2005–2008	Triestina	93	(7)
2008–2010	Salernitana	63	(3)
2010–2011	Iraklis	14	(0)
2012–2013	Rochester Rhinos	36	(0)
2016	Rochester Rhinos	5	(0)
Total		372	(27)

International career
1994–1996	Greece U16	17	(5)
1996–1998	Greece U18	19	(4)
1999–2002	Greece U21	23	(3)

Managerial career
- 2015–2018: Rochester Rhinos (Assistant)
- 2016: Rochester Rhinos (Player-coach)
- 2020–2023: Greece women (Head Coach)
- 2024: Ethnikos Neo Keramidi (Head Coach)
- 2025: Forge FC (Assistant)
- * Club domestic league appearances and goals

Georgios Kyriazis (Greek: Γεώργιος Κυριαζής; born 28 February 1980 in Thessaloniki) is a Greek former professional footballer and a UEFA Pro football manager, best known for his long career as a defender in Greece and Italy and for his later work in player development and coaching. He is currently the assistant coach of Canadian Premier League Club Forge FC.

== Playing career ==
He came through the youth system of Makedonikos Litis before joining the professional club of Iraklis in 1996, one of the city's most historic clubs. He made his professional debut with Iraklis F.C. at the age of 16, and spent seven seasons there, becoming a regular starter and earning respect for his consistency, strong defensive positioning, and ability to read the game.

In 2003, Kyriazis moved to Italy, beginning a decade-long chapter of his career in Serie B. He first joined Catania FC, where he played a key role in the club's defensive line and helped stabilize the team during multiple league campaigns. His performances earned him further opportunities within Italian football, leading to spells with Arezzo, Triestina, and Salernitana. During this period, he became known as a reliable centre-back with leadership qualities, eventually serving as a veteran presence in the squads he joined. Across his time in Italy and Greece, Kyriazis totaled more than 370 professional club appearances.

On the international stage, Kyriazis represented Greece at youth level, earning caps with the Under-21 national team. He was part of the Greece U21 squad that reached the final of the 2002 UEFA European Under-21 Championship, one of the most successful youth team runs in the country's history. His involvement in that tournament highlighted him as one of the more promising Greek defenders of his generation. Late in his playing career, Kyriazis signed with the Rochester Rhinos in the United States in 2011. Competing in the USL, he continued to serve as a dependable defender. His time with the Rhinos marked the final chapter of his playing career, and he remained with the club through the 2013 season.

== Managerial career ==
After retiring from playing in 2013, following two seasons with the Rochester Rhinos in the United States, Kyriazis transitioned fully into coaching and development work. In March 2015 he was brought on as an assistant coach under head coach Bob Lilley, helping oversee what became a landmark season for the club. During the 2015 campaign the Rhinos finished top of the regular-season table in the United Soccer League and went on to win the USL Championship, marking one of the most successful seasons in the club's history.

Kyriazis returned to Greece to take on roles within the national football structure, including positions connected to youth programs and talent pathways. In August 2020, he was appointed head coach of the Greece women's national football team, marking a major milestone in his coaching career and placing him in charge of the country's highest-level women's program. His tenure has emphasized long-term development, improved training standards, and increasing the competitiveness of Greek women's football on the international stage.

After his tenure as head coach of the Greece women's national football team, Kyriazis made the decision to return to men's football, taking the helm of P.S. Ethnikos Neo Keramidi in 2024. In July of that year he was appointed head coach of the club, stepping into the challenge of guiding a men's squad in Super League Greece 2. His move marked a clear pivot from women's international football back into the men's club game. At Ethnikos Neo Keramidi he aimed to bring his experience in youth development, defensive organization and international exposure to a club looking to continue its rise. The switch signalled Kyriazis’ ambition to test his managerial skills in the men's game at a different level and broaden his coaching résumé.

In early 2025, Kyriazis accepted a role as an assistant coach with Forge FC, marking a new adventure in his coaching career. Moving to Hamilton, he stepped into a club with a strong identity and a growing reputation, but also one that welcomed the experience and calm leadership he brought with him. The season turned out to be a memorable one. Forge went on to win the 2025 Canadian Premier League final, finishing at the top of the regular-season table after a convincing 3–0 victory over York United FC on the final day.
