= Cyril Yapi =

French footballer (born 1980)

Personal information
- Date of birth: 18 February 1980 (age 46)
- Place of birth: Lorient, France
- Height: 1.75 m (5 ft 9 in)
- Position: Midfielder

Senior career*
Years	Team	Apps	(Gls)
1998–2000	Rennes	19	(0)
2000–2001	Laval	27	(4)
2001–2003	Rennes	16	(0)
2003–2004	Como	19	(0)
- * Club domestic league appearances and goals

Cyril Yapi (born 18 February 1980) is a French former professional footballer who played for Ligue 1 club Rennes between 1998 and 2003 and for Serie B club Como during the 2003–04 season.
