= Oussama Sellami =

Tunisian footballer (born 1979)

Personal information
- Date of birth: 22 June 1979 (age 47)
- Place of birth: Tunis, Tunisia
- Height: 1.86 m (6 ft 1 in)
- Position: Midfielder

Youth career
- Stade Tunisien

Senior career*
Years	Team	Apps	(Gls)
1999–2004	Stade Tunisien	95	(22)
2004–2011	Club Africain	198	(36)
2011–2014	Stade Tunisien	41	(6)
Total		334	(64)

International career
2000–2002	Tunisia	8	(0)
- * Club domestic league appearances and goals

Oussama Sellami (born 22 June 1979) is a Tunisian former professional footballer who played as a midfielder for Stade Tunisien and Club Africain. He made eight appearances for the Tunisia national team.

He made his international debut for Tunisia on 15 November 2000 against Switzerland.
