= David Vandenbossche =

French footballer (born 1980)

Personal information
- Date of birth: 27 September 1980 (age 46)
- Place of birth: Dunkerque, France
- Height: 1.83 m (6 ft 0 in)
- Position: Forward

Youth career
- 1998–2000: Auxerre

Senior career*
Years	Team	Apps	(Gls)
2000–2005	Auxerre	20	(0)
2004	→ Châteauroux (loan)	13	(2)
2005–2008	Châteauroux	80	(9)
2008–2009	Boulogne	14	(1)
2010	Lausanne-Sport	11	(1)
2010–2011	Paris	34	(0)
2011–2013	Auxerre B		
- * Club domestic league appearances and goals

David Vandenbossche (born 27 September 1980) is a French former professional footballer who played as a forward.

== Career ==
Born in Dunkerque, Vandenbossche began his career as part of the youth academy at French club Auxerre. He left the club in 2004, to join Ligue 2 side Châteauroux on loan for six months, before moving back to Auxerre, later that year, he joined Châteauroux permanently. In 2008, he joined French second tier club Boulogne and on 31 July 2009 Boulogne released him. On 2 February 2010, Vandenbossche signed for Lausanne-Sport on a free transfer until the end of the season. After a short stay in Switzerland, Vandenbossche moved on to Paris FC for one season before joining the Auxerre reserve team in 2011.
