= Bassam Dâassi =

Tunisian footballer

Personal information
- Date of birth: 13 September 1980 (age 46)
- Position: Forward

Senior career*
Years	Team	Apps	(Gls)
2000–2004	Stade Tunisien		
- FC Bulle
- CS Sfaxien

International career
2001–2002	Tunisia	3	(2)
- * Club domestic league appearances and goals

Bassam Dâassi (born 13 September 1980) is a Tunisian former professional footballer who played as a forward. He played in three matches for the Tunisia national team in 2001 and 2002. He was also named in Tunisia's squad for the 2002 African Cup of Nations tournament.
