= Mohamed Selliti =

Tunisian footballer

Personal information
- Date of birth: March 28, 1981 (age 45)
- Place of birth: Sousse, Tunisia
- Height: 1.83 m (6 ft 0 in)
- Position: Striker

Youth career
- Stade Tunisien

Senior career*
Years	Team	Apps	(Gls)
2001–2004	Stade Tunisien	64	(28)
2004–2006	Club Africain	57	(20)
2006–2007	Étoile Sportive du Sahel	12	(4)
2007–2009	Stade Tunisien	58	(26)
2009–2010	Ismaily	22	(4)
2010–2012	Stade Tunisien	25	(5)
2012–2014	Olympique Béja		

International career
2002–2009	Tunisia	13	(0)
- * Club domestic league appearances and goals

Mohamed Selliti (Arabic: محمد السليتي) (born 28 March 1981) is a Tunisian footballer. He plays as a striker as well as Tunisia national football team.
