= 1997–98 AJ Auxerre season =

Auxerre
1997–98 season
- President: Jean-Claude Hamel
- Head coach: Guy Roux
- Stadium: Stade de l'Abbé-Deschamps
- Division 1: 7th
- Coupe de France: Second round
- Coupe de la Ligue: Semi-finals
- Intertoto Cup: Winners
- UEFA Cup: Quarter-finals
- Top goalscorer: League: Stéphane Guivarc'h (21); All: Stéphane Guivarc'h (46)
- Average home league attendance: 10,974

The 1997–98 season was the 92nd season in the existence of AJ Auxerre and the club's 18th consecutive season in the top-flight of French football. In addition to the domestic league, Auxerre participated in this season's editions of the Coupe de France, the Coupe de la Ligue, the UEFA Intertoto Cup and UEFA Cup.

== Season summary ==
Auxerre dropped one place in the final table to 7th. They had better success in the cup competitions, reaching the semi-finals of the Coupe de la Ligue and the quarter-finals of the UEFA Cup, winning the Intertoto Cup in the process. Instrumental to Auxerre's success was the form of Stéphane Guivarc'h, who scored 21 league goals to win the Golden Boot; Guivarc'h added 24 further goals across the cups to finish with an astonishing 45 goals in all competitions.

== Players ==
=== First-team squad ===
Squad at end of season

Note: Flags indicate national team as defined under FIFA eligibility rules; some limited exceptions apply. Players may hold more than one non-FIFA nationality.

No.	Pos.	Nation	Player
1	GK	FRA	Lionel Charbonnier
16	GK	FRA	Fabien Cool
12	DF	FRA	Éric Assati
20	DF	FRA	Laurent Ciechelski
5	DF	FRA	Frédéric Danjou
2	DF	FRA	Alain Goma
13	DF	FRA	Jean-Sébastien Jaurès
22	DF	FRA	Frédéric Jay
14	DF	FRA	Cyril Jeunechamp
3	DF	FRA	Franck Rabarivony
21	DF	FRA	Johan Radet
19	DF	FRA	David Recorbet
4	DF	FRA	Franck Silvestre
27	DF	NGA	Michael Yobo
25	MF	TOG	Kuami Agboh
11	MF	FRA	Bernard Diomède

No.	Pos.	Nation	Player
6	MF	FRA	Christian Henna
8	MF	FRA	Yann Lachuer
7	MF	FRA	Sabri Lamouchi
10	MF	FRA	Antoine Sibierski
24	MF	FRA	Benjamin Nivet
32	MF	MAR	Tarik Sektioui
29	MF	FIN	Teemu Tainio
28	FW	FRA	Xavier Chalier
26	MF	FRA	Arnaud Gonzalez
33	FW	FRA	Sébastien Heitzmann
15	FW	FRA	Fabrice Lepaul
23	FW	FRA	Lilian Compan
18	FW	FRA	Thomas Deniaud
9	FW	FRA	Stéphane Guivarc'h
17	FW	FRA	Steve Marlet

=== Reserves ===
Note: Flags indicate national team as defined under FIFA eligibility rules; some limited exceptions apply. Players may hold more than one non-FIFA nationality.

No. / Pos. / Nation / Player; — / MF / FRA / Nicolas Marin	No. / Pos. / Nation / Player; — / FW / FRA / Djibril Cissé

== Competitions ==
=== Division 1 ===
==== League table ====
Pos	Team	Pld	W	D	L	GF	GA	GD	Pts	Qualification or relegation
5	Bordeaux	34	15	11	8	49	41	+8	56	Qualification to UEFA Cup first round
6	Lyon	34	16	5	13	39	37	+2	53	Qualification to UEFA Cup first round
7	Auxerre	34	14	9	11	55	45	+10	51	Qualification to Intertoto Cup third round
8	Paris Saint-Germain	34	14	8	12	43	35	+8	50	Qualification to Cup Winners' Cup first round (Note: Paris Saint-Germain qualified for the 1998–99 UEFA Cup Winners' Cup as winners of the 1997–98 Coupe de France and 1997–98 Coupe de la Ligue.)
9	Bastia	34	13	11	10	36	31	+5	50	Qualification to Intertoto Cup second round

Source: Ligue 1
Rules for classification: 1) points; 2) goal difference; 3) number of goals scored.

==== Results summary ====
Overall								Home						Away					
Pld	W	D	L	GF	GA	GD	Pts	W	D	L	GF	GA	GD	W	D	L	GF	GA	GD
34	14	9	11	55	45	+10	51	10	4	3	36	16	+20	4	5	8	19	29	−10

Source: French Division 1

==== Results by round ====
Round	1	2	3	4	5	6	7	8	9	10	11	12	13	14	15	16	17	18	19	20	21	22	23	24	25	26	27	28	29	30	31	32	33	34
Ground	A	H	A	H	A	H	A	H	A	H	A	H	A	A	H	A	H	A	H	A	H	A	H	A	H	A	H	A	H	H	A	H	A	H
Result	L	L	W	W	L	W	L	L	L	W	W	W	W	D	D	L	W	L	W	D	W	L	W	L	D	D	D	W	W	L	D	W	D	D
Position	18	17	13	9	12	6	9	11	11	11	9	7	5	6	7	8	8	8	7	7	6	7	6	8	7	8	9	8	8	8	8	8	7	7

Source: French Division 1
A = Away; H = Home; W = Win; D = Draw; L = Loss

=== Intertoto Cup ===
==== Group stage ====
Pos	Team	Pld	W	D	L	GF	GA	GD	Pts	Qualification	AUX	LS	ANT	NSL	ARD
1	(France) Auxerre	4	3	1	0	19	2	+17	10	Advanced to semi-finals	—	1–1	5–0	—	—
2	(Switzerland) Lausanne Sports	4	2	2	0	13	4	+9	8		—	—	—	4–1	6–0
3	(Belgium) Royal Antwerp	4	2	1	1	7	7	0	7		—	2–2	—	4–0	—
4	(Cyprus) Nea Salamis Famagusta	4	1	0	3	6	19	−13	3		1–10	—	—	—	4–1
5	(Northern Ireland) Ards	4	0	0	4	1	14	−13	0		0–3	—	0–1	—	—

Source: rsssf.com

28 June 1997 1	Auxerre (France)	1–1	(Switzerland) Lausanne Sports	Auxerre, France
	Guivarc'h 38'		Ohrel 45' (pen.)	Stadium: Stade Abbé-Deschamps; Attendance: 3,917; Referee: Emanuel Zammit (Malta)

5 July 1997 2	Ards (Northern Ireland)	0–3	(France) Auxerre	Newtownards, Northern Ireland
			Compan 65'; Sibierski 79'; Guivarc'h 89'	Stadium: Castlereagh Park; Referee: Zoran Arsić (FR Yugoslavia)

12 July 1997 3	Auxerre (France)	5–0	(Belgium) Royal Antwerp	Auxerre, France
	Diomède 11', 30'; Marlet 25'; Guivarc'h 59', 72'			Stadium: Stade Abbé-Deschamps; Attendance: 5,000; Referee: Attila Juhos (Hungary)

19 July 1997 4	Nea Salamis Famagusta (Cyprus)	1–10	(France) Auxerre	Larnaca, Cyprus
	Demetriou 86'		Guivarc'h 13', 20', 24', 54', 84'; Diomède 51', 81'; Lachuer 66', 77'; Marlet 70'	Stadium: Ammochostos Stadium; Attendance: 400; Referee: Gerry Perry (Ireland)

==== Semi-finals ====
26 July 1997 First leg	Auxerre (France)	3–0	(Russia) Torpedo Moscow	Auxerre, France
21:00	Goma 43'; Diomède 58'; Marlet 64'	Report		Stadium: Stade Abbé-Deschamps; Attendance: 5,000; Referee: Karol Ihring (Slovakia)

30 July 1997 Second leg	Torpedo Moscow (Russia)	4–1 (4–4a agg.)	(France) Auxerre	Moscow, Russia
17:00	Gashkin 23'; Mashkarin 36'; Samarone 50'; Carlos Alberto 88' (pen.)	Report	Guivarc'h 43'	Stadium: Eduard Streltsov Stadium; Attendance: 3,000; Referee: László Vagner (Hungary)

==== Finals ====
12 August 1997 First leg	Duisburg (Germany)	0–0	(France) Auxerre	Duisburg, Germany
20:20		Report		Stadium: Wedaustadion; Attendance: 9,350; Referee: Sándor Puhl (Hungary)

26 August 1997 Second leg	Auxerre (France)	2–0 (2–0 agg.)	(Germany) Duisburg	Auxerre, France
21:00	Diomède 56'; Jeunechamp 83'	Report		Stadium: Stade de l'Abbé-Deschamps; Attendance: 9,000; Referee: Anders Frisk (Sweden)

=== UEFA Cup ===
==== First round ====
16 September 1997 First leg	Deportivo La Coruña (Spain)	1–2	(France) Auxerre	A Coruña, Spain
21:00	Djalminha 87'	Report	Diomède 72'; Guivarc'h 84'	Stadium: Riazor; Attendance: 24,000; Referee: Georg Dardenne (Germany)

30 September 1997 Second leg	Auxerre (France)	0–0 (2–1 agg.)	(Spain) Deportivo La Coruña	Auxerre, France
20:00		Report		Stadium: Stade de l'Abbé-Deschamps; Attendance: 18,000; Referee: Nikolai Levnikov (Russia)

==== Second round ====
21 October 1997 First leg	Auxerre (France)	3–1	(Greece) OFI Crete	Auxerre, France
20:30	Sibierski 15'; Guivarc'h 61', 90'	Report	Nioplias 13'	Stadium: Stade de l'Abbé-Deschamps; Attendance: 21,000; Referee: Miroslav Radoman (FR Yugoslavia)

4 November 1997 Second leg	OFI Crete (Greece)	3–2 (4–5 agg.)	(France) Auxerre	Heraklion, Greece
20:00	Papadopoulos 57', 75' (pen.); Anastasiou 90'	Report	Guivarc'h 37'; Deniaud 60'	Stadium: Theodoros Vardinogiannis Stadium; Attendance: 9,000; Referee: Mario van der Ende (Netherlands)

==== Third round ====
25 November 1997 First leg	Twente (Netherlands)	0–1	(France) Auxerre	Enschede, Netherlands
18:45		Report	Diomède 70'	Stadium: De Grolsch Veste; Attendance: 10,000; Referee: Terje Hauge (Norway)

9 December 1997 Second leg	Auxerre (France)	2–0 (3–0 agg.)	(Netherlands) Twente	Auxerre, France
20:00	Diomède 3'; Guivarc'h 82' (pen.)	Report		Stadium: Stade de l'Abbé-Deschamps; Attendance: 20,000; Referee: Aron Huzu (Romania)

==== Quarter-finals ====
3 March 1998 First leg	Lazio (Italy)	1–0	(France) Auxerre	Rome, Italy
20:00	Casiraghi 64'	Report		Stadium: Stadio Olimpico; Attendance: 40,000; Referee: Michel Piraux (Belgium)

17 March 1998 Second leg	Auxerre (France)	2–2 (2–3 agg.)	(Italy) Lazio	Auxerre, France
20:15	Guivarc'h 39', 81'	Report	Mancini 8' (pen.); Gottardi 13'	Stadium: Stade de l'Abbé-Deschamps; Attendance: 22,000; Referee: Antonio Jesús López Nieto (Spain)
