= 2002–03 AJ Auxerre season =

Auxerre
2002–03 season
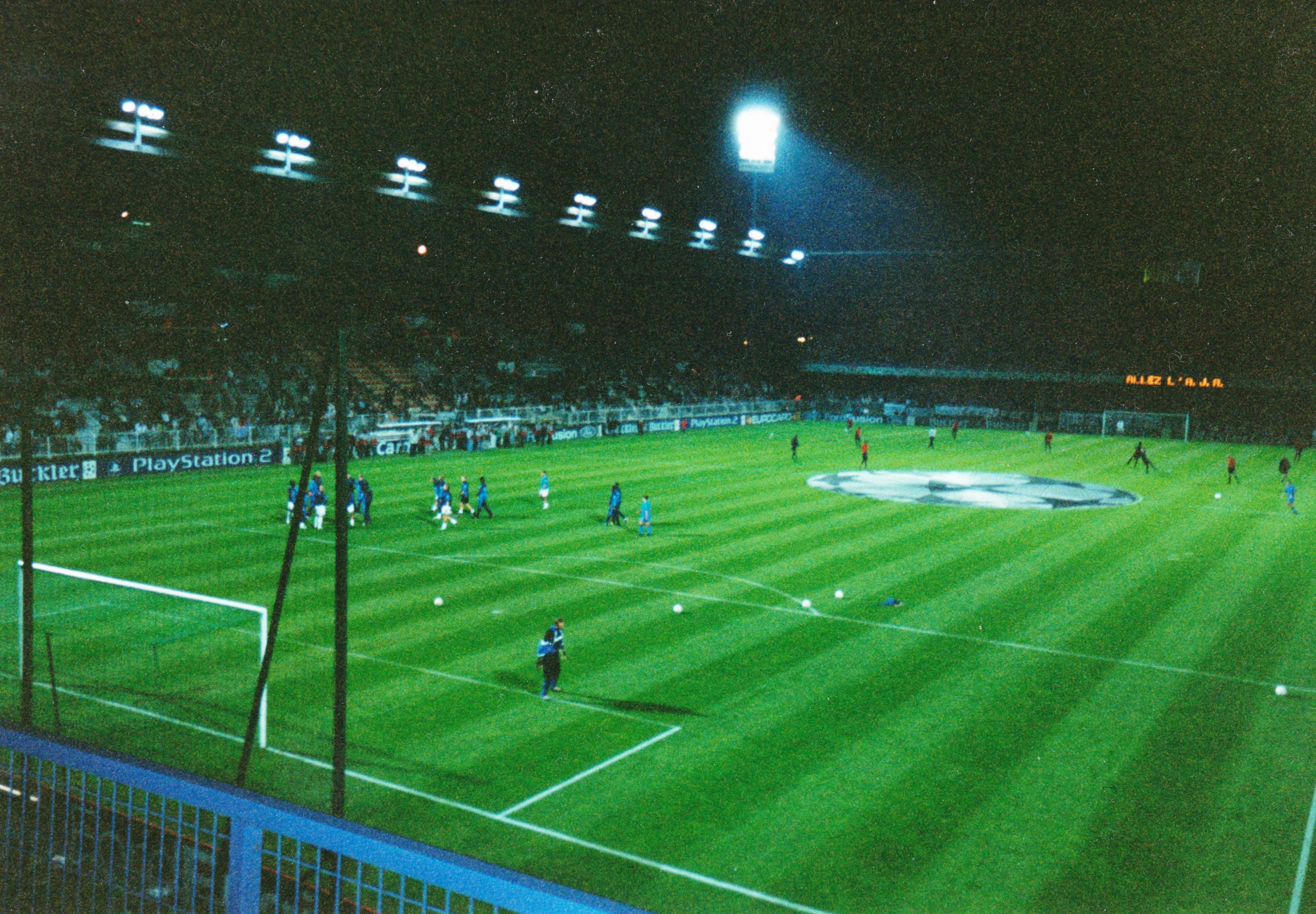
- Before Auxerre's game against Arsenal, October 2, 2002
- President: Jean-Claude Hamel
- Head coach: Guy Roux
- Stadium: Stade de l'Abbé-Deschamps
- Ligue 1: 6th
- Coupe de France: Winners
- Coupe de la Ligue: Round of 16
- Champions League: First group stage
- UEFA Cup: Fourth round
- Top goalscorer: League: Djibril Cisse (14); All: Djibril Cisse (21)
- Average home league attendance: 10,974

The 2002–03 season was the 97th season in the existence of AJ Auxerre and the club's 23rd consecutive season in the top-flight of French football. In addition to the domestic league, Auxerre participated in this season's editions of the Coupe de France, the Coupe de la Ligue, the UEFA Champions League and UEFA Cup.

== Season summary ==
Auxerre missed out on only a second-ever league title by four points, finishing in sixth to qualify for the UEFA Cup. They were also knocked out of the Champions League in the first group stage, finishing behind Arsenal and Dortmund, and the UEFA Cup in the fourth round by Liverpool. Compensation came in the form of winning the Coupe de France.

== First team squad ==
Squad at end of season

Note: Flags indicate national team as defined under FIFA eligibility rules; some limited exceptions apply. Players may hold more than one non-FIFA nationality.

No.	Pos.	Nation	Player
1	GK	FRA	Fabien Cool
2	DF	FRA	Johan Radet
3	DF	FRA	Jean-Sébastien Jaurès
4	DF	CMR	Jean-Alain Boumsong
5	DF	FRA	Philippe Mexès
6	MF	TOG	Kuami Agboh
7	MF	SEN	Amdy Faye
8	MF	FRA	Yann Lachuer
9	FW	FRA	Djibril Cissé
10	MF	FIN	Teemu Tainio
11	MF	SEN	Khalilou Fadiga
13	DF	SUI	Stéphane Grichting
14	MF	FRA	David Vandenbossche
16	GK	FRA	Sébastien Hamel
18	MF	FRA	Lionel Mathis
19	MF	FRA	Nicolas Marin
20	MF	FRA	Arnaud Gonzalez
21	FW	ZIM	Benjani Mwaruwari
23	FW	FRA	Olivier Kapo
24	MF	FRA	Pierre Deblock

No.	Pos.	Nation	Player
25	DF	FRA	David Recorbet
26	DF	FRA	Jean-Joël Perrier-Doumbé
27	MF	FRA	Pantxi Sirieix
28	FW	FRA	Romain Poyet
29	DF	FRA	Joseph Assati
30	GK	FRA	Baptiste Chabert
31	MF	FRA	Hassan Yebda
32	MF	CIV	Kanga Akalé
33	MF	FRA	Jean-Pascal Mignot
34	FW	FRA	Benoit Leroy
35	DF	FRA	Richard Suriano
37	MF	FRA	Ferdinand Bitangane
38	MF	FRA	Sebastien Cochet
39	FW	FRA	Rafik Djebbour
40	MF	FRA	Kevin Lejeune
41	MF	FRA	Baptiste Llop
42	MF	FRA	Julien Petitjean
43	DF	FRA	Guillaume Legacheur
44	GK	FRA	Christophe Langlois

=== Left club during season ===
Note: Flags indicate national team as defined under FIFA eligibility rules; some limited exceptions apply. Players may hold more than one non-FIFA nationality.

No.	Pos.	Nation	Player
15	DF	FRA	Frédéric Jay (on loan to Rennes)
17	FW	POR	Hélder Esteves (on to Créteil)

No.	Pos.	Nation	Player
22	FW	FRA	Pedro Kamata (on loan to Clermont Foot)

== Competitions ==
=== Overall record ===
Competition	First match	Last match	Starting round	Final position	Record							
Competition	First match	Last match	Starting round	Final position	Pld	W	D	L	GF	GA	GD	Win %
Ligue 1	3 August 2002	24 May 2003	Matchday 1	6th	38	18	10	10	38	29	+9	47.37
Coupe de France	4 January 2003	31 May 2003	Round of 64	Winners	6	5	1	0	12	4	+8	83.33
Coupe de la Ligue	8 December 2002		Round of 32	Round of 32	1	0	0	1	0	1	−1	0.00
Champions League	13 August 2002	12 November 2002	Third qualifying round	First group stage	8	3	2	3	5	7	−2	37.50
UEFA Cup	28 November 2002	27 February 2003	Third round	Fourth round	4	1	0	3	2	4	−2	25.00
Total					57	27	13	17	57	45	+12	47.37

Source: Competitions

=== Ligue 1 ===
==== League table ====
Pos	Team	Pld	W	D	L	GF	GA	GD	Pts	Qualification or relegation
4	Bordeaux	38	18	10	10	57	36	+21	64	Qualification to UEFA Cup first round
5	Sochaux	38	17	13	8	46	31	+15	64	Qualification to UEFA Cup first round
6	Auxerre	38	18	10	10	38	29	+9	64	Qualification to UEFA Cup first round
7	Guingamp	38	19	5	14	59	46	+13	62	Qualification to Intertoto Cup third round
8	Lens	38	14	15	9	43	31	+12	57	Qualification to UEFA Cup qualifying round (Note: Lens qualified for the UEFA Cup qualifying round through the UEFA Fair Play ranking award.)

Source: Ligue 1
Rules for classification: 1) points; 2) goal difference; 3) number of goals scored.

==== Results summary ====
Overall								Home						Away					
Pld	W	D	L	GF	GA	GD	Pts	W	D	L	GF	GA	GD	W	D	L	GF	GA	GD
38	18	10	10	38	29	+9	64	11	5	3	19	8	+11	7	5	7	19	21	−2

==== Results by round ====
Round	1	2	3	4	5	6	7	8	9	10	11	12	13	14	15	16	17	18	19	20	21	22	23	24	25	26	27	28	29	30	31	32	33	34	35	36	37	38
Ground	A	H	A	H	A	H	A	H	A	H	A	H	A	A	H	A	H	A	H	A	H	A	H	A	H	A	H	A	H	A	H	H	A	H	A	H	A	H
Result	L	W	W	W	D	W	D	W	W	D	L	W	L	L	L	W	W	D	D	D	W	W	D	L	W	W	L	L	L	D	D	W	L	W	W	D	W	W
Position	16	9	4	2	2	2	2	2	2	2	7	4	7	8	10	9	6	6	7	7	7	5	4	6	5	3	4	7	7	9	9	9	8	6	6	6	6	6

A = Away; H = Home; W = Win; D = Draw; L = Loss

==== Matches ====
3 August 2002 1	Paris Saint-Germain	1–0	Auxerre	Paris
20:00				Stadium: Parc des Princes

8 August 2002 2	Auxerre	2–0	Montpellier	Auxerre
20:00				Stadium: Stade de l'Abbé-Deschamps

17 August 2002 3	Troyes	1–2	Auxerre	Troyes
20:00				Stadium: Stade de l'Aube

24 August 2002 4	Auxerre	2–1	Guingamp	Auxerre
20:00				Stadium: Stade de l'Abbé-Deschamps

1 September 2002 5	Marseille	0–0	Auxerre	Marseille
20:45				Stadium: Stade Vélodrome

11 September 2002 6	Auxerre	1–0	Bastia	Auxerre
20:30				Stadium: Stade de l'Abbé-Deschamps

14 September 2002 7	Sochaux	1–1	Auxerre	Montbéliard
20:00				Stadium: Stade Auguste Bonal

28 September 2002 9	Nantes	1–4	Auxerre	Nantes
17:15				Stadium: Stade de la Beaujoire

6 October 2002 10	Auxerre	1–1	Monaco	Auxerre
18:15				Stadium: Stade de l'Abbé-Deschamps

19 October 2002 11	Lyon	3–0	Auxerre	Lyon
17:15				Stadium: Stade de Gerland

26 October 2002 12	Auxerre	1–0	Rennes	Auxerre
20:00				Stadium: Stade de l'Abbé-Deschamps

2 November 2002 13	Lens	3–1	Auxerre	Lens
20:00				Stadium: Stade Félix Bollaert

7 November 2002 14	Ajaccio	1–0	Auxerre	Ajaccio
20:00				Stadium: Stade François Coty

16 November 2002 15	Auxerre	0–2	Nice	Auxerre
17:30				Stadium: Stade de l'Abbé-Deschamps

23 November 2002 16	Le Havre	0–1	Auxerre	Le Havre
20:00				Stadium: Stade Jules Deschaseaux

1 December 2002 17	Auxerre	1–0	Bordeaux	Auxerre
20:45				Stadium: Stade de l'Abbé-Deschamps

4 December 2002 18	Lille	2–2	Auxerre	Lille
20:30				Stadium: Stade Grimonprez-Jooris

15 December 2002 19	Auxerre	0–0	Strasbourg	Auxerre
20:00				Stadium: Stade de l'Abbé-Deschamps

11 January 2003 21	Auxerre	1–0	Troyes	Auxerre
20:00				Stadium: Stade de l'Abbé-Deschamps

15 January 2003 22	Guingamp	0–2	Auxerre	Guingamp
20:30				Stadium: Stade de Roudourou

18 January 2003 20	Montpellier	0–0	Auxerre	Montpellier
19:00				Stadium: Stade de la Mosson

21 January 2003 23	Auxerre	0–0	Marseille	Auxerre
20:45				Stadium: Stade de l'Abbé-Deschamps

29 January 2003 24	Bastia	2–0	Auxerre	Furiani
20:30				Stadium: Stade Armand Cesari

1 February 2003 25	Auxerre	2–0	Sochaux	Auxerre
17:15				Stadium: Stade de l'Abbé-Deschamps

5 February 2003 26	Sedan	1–2	Auxerre	Sedan
18:00				Stadium: Stade Louis Dugauguez

9 February 2003 27	Auxerre	0–1	Nantes	Auxerre
20:45				Stadium: Stade de l'Abbé-Deschamps

23 February 2003 28	Monaco	3–1	Auxerre	Monaco
20:45				Stadium: Stade Louis II

2 March 2003 29	Auxerre	1–2	Lyon	Auxerre
20:45				Stadium: Stade de l'Abbé-Deschamps

8 March 2003 30	Rennes	0–0	Auxerre	Rennes
17:15				Stadium: Stade de la Route de Lorient

22 March 2003 31	Auxerre	0–0	Lens	Auxerre
20:00				Stadium: Stade de l'Abbé-Deschamps

5 April 2003 32	Auxerre	1–0	Ajaccio	Auxerre
20:00				Stadium: Stade de l'Abbé-Deschamps

8 April 2003 8	Auxerre	3–1	Sedan	Auxerre
20:00				Stadium: Stade de l'Abbé-Deschamps

12 April 2003 33	Nice	1–0	Auxerre	Nice
20:00				Stadium: Stade du Ray

19 April 2003 34	Auxerre	1–0	Le Havre	Auxerre
20:00				Stadium: Stade de l'Abbé-Deschamps

3 May 2003 35	Bordeaux	0–1	Auxerre	Bordeaux
20:00				Stadium: Stade Chaban-Delmas

10 May 2003 36	Auxerre	0–0	Lille	Auxerre
20:00				Stadium: Stade de l'Abbé-Deschamps

20 May 2003 37	Strasbourg	1–2	Auxerre	Strasbourg
20:30				Stadium: Stade de la Meinau

24 May 2003 38	Auxerre	2–0	Paris Saint-Germain	Auxerre
20:30				Stadium: Stade de l'Abbé-Deschamps

=== Coupe de France ===
4 January 2003 Round of 64	Caen	1–2	Auxerre	Caen
				Stadium: Stade Michel d'Ornano

25 January 2003 Round of 32	Amnéville	0–3	Auxerre	Amnéville
				Stadium: Stade Municipal

15 February 2003 Round of 16	Bourg-en-Bresse	1–3	Auxerre	Lyon
				Stadium: Stade de Gerland

16 March 2003 Quarter-finals	Angoulême	0–0 (2–4 p)	Auxerre	Poitiers
				Stadium: Stade de la Pépinière

26 April 2003 Semi-finals	Auxerre	2–1	Rennes	Auxerre
	Cissé 42', 90'		Sorlin 63'	Stadium: Stade de l'Abbé Deschamps

31 May 2003 Final	Paris Saint-Germain	1–2	Auxerre	Saint-Denis
	Hugo Leal 21'		Cissé 76'; Boumsong 89'	Stadium: Stade de France; Attendance: 78,000; Referee: Bertrand Layec

=== Coupe de la Ligue ===
8 December 2002 Round of 32	Monaco	1–0	Auxerre	Monaco
				Stadium: Stade Louis II

=== Champions League ===
==== Third qualifying round ====
13 August 2002 First leg	Boavista (Portugal)	0–1	(France) Auxerre	Porto, Portugal
22:00		Report	Cissé 71'	Stadium: Estádio do Bessa; Attendance: 8,000; Referee: Valentin Ivanov (Russia)

28 August 2002 Second leg	Auxerre (France)	0–0 (1–0 agg.)	(Portugal) Boavista	Auxerre, France
20:30		Report		Stadium: Stade de l'Abbé-Deschamps; Attendance: 14,500; Referee: Pierluigi Collina (Italy)

==== First group stage ====
Pos	Team	Pld	W	D	L	GF	GA	GD	Pts	Qualification
1	(England) Arsenal	6	3	1	2	9	4	+5	10	Advance to second group stage
2	(Germany) Borussia Dortmund	6	3	1	2	8	7	+1	10	Advance to second group stage
3	(France) Auxerre	6	2	1	3	4	7	−3	7	Transfer to UEFA Cup
4	(Netherlands) PSV Eindhoven	6	1	3	2	5	8	−3	6	

Source: RSSSF

17 September 2002 1	Auxerre (France)	0–0	(Netherlands) PSV Eindhoven	Auxerre, France
20:45		Report		Stadium: Stade de l'Abbé-Deschamps; Attendance: 11,902; Referee: Alfredo Trentalange (Italy)

25 September 2002 2	Borussia Dortmund (Germany)	2–1	(France) Auxerre	Dortmund, Germany
20:45	Koller 6'; Amoroso 78'	Report	Benjani 83'	Stadium: Westfalenstadion; Attendance: 46,500; Referee: Terje Hauge (Norway)

2 October 2002 3	Auxerre (France)	0–1	(England) Arsenal	Auxerre, France
20:45		Report	Gilberto Silva 48'	Stadium: Stade de l'Abbé-Deschamps; Attendance: 19,454; Referee: Frank De Bleeckere (Belgium)

22 October 2002 4	Arsenal (England)	1–2	(France) Auxerre	London, England
20:45	Kanu 53'	Report	Kapo 8'; Fadiga 27'	Stadium: Highbury; Attendance: 35,302; Referee: Domenico Messina (Italy)

30 October 2002 5	PSV Eindhoven (Netherlands)	3–0	(France) Auxerre	Eindhoven, Netherlands
20:45	Bruggink 34'; Rommedahl 48'; Robben 64'	Report		Stadium: Philips Stadion; Attendance: 27,500; Referee: Knud Erik Fisker (Denmark)

12 November 2002 6	Auxerre (France)	1–0	(Germany) Borussia Dortmund	Auxerre, France
20:45	Benjani 76'	Report		Stadium: Stade de l'Abbé-Deschamps; Attendance: 16,959; Referee: Sorin Corpodean (Romania)

=== UEFA Cup ===
==== Third round ====
28 November 2002 First leg	Real Betis (Spain)	1–0	(France) Auxerre	Seville, Spain
21:30	Alfonso 10' (pen.)	Report		Stadium: Estadio Manuel Ruíz de Lopera; Attendance: 25,000; Referee: Helmut Fleischer (Germany)

12 December 2002 Second leg	Auxerre (France)	2–0 (2–1 agg.)	(Spain) Real Betis	Auxerre, France
19:30	Tainio 19'; Lachuer 48'	Report		Stadium: Stade de l'Abbé-Deschamps; Attendance: 12,000; Referee: Stuart Dougal (Scotland)

==== Fourth round ====
20 February 2003 First leg	Auxerre (France)	0–1	(England) Liverpool	Auxerre, France
20:45		Report	Hyypiä 72'	Stadium: Stade de l'Abbé-Deschamps; Attendance: 20,452; Referee: Massimo De Santis (Italy)

27 February 2003 Second leg	Liverpool (England)	2–0 (3–0 agg.)	(France) Auxerre	Liverpool, England
21:05	Owen 66'; Murphy 72'	Report		Stadium: Anfield; Attendance: 34,252; Referee: Antonio López Nieto (Spain)

== Transfers ==
=== In ===
Date	Pos.	Name	From	Fee	Source

=== Out ===
Date	Pos.	Name	To	Fee	Source

=== Loans in ===
Start	Pos.	Name	From	Expiry	Source

=== Loans out ===
Start	Pos.	Name	To	Expiry	Source
