= 2001–02 AJ Auxerre season =

Auxerre
2001–02 season
- President: Bernard Lecomte
- Head coach: Guy Roux
- Stadium: Stade de l'Abbé-Deschamps
- Division 1: 3rd
- Coupe de France: Round of 64
- Coupe de la Ligue: Round of 16
- Top goalscorer: League: Djibril Cissé (22); All: Djibril Cissé (22)
- Average home league attendance: 12,206

The 2001–02 season was the 96th season in the history of AJ Auxerre and the club's third consecutive season in the top flight of French football. They participated in the Ligue 1, the Coupe de France and the Coupe de la Ligue.

== Players ==
=== First-team squad ===
Note: Flags indicate national team as defined under FIFA eligibility rules; some limited exceptions apply. Players may hold more than one non-FIFA nationality.

| No. | Pos. | Nation | Player |
|---|---|---|---|
| 1 | GK | FRA | Fabien Cool |
| 2 | DF | FRA | Johan Radet |
| 3 | MF | CIV | Lassina Diabaté |
| 4 | DF | FRA | Jean-Alain Boumsong |
| 5 | DF | FRA | Philippe Mexes |
| 6 | MF | TOG | Kuami Agboh |
| 7 | MF | SEN | Amdy Faye |
| 8 | MF | FRA | Yann Lachuer |
| 9 | FW | FRA | Djibril Cissé |
| 10 | MF | FIN | Teemu Tainio |
| 11 | FW | SEN | Khalilou Fadiga |
| 12 | FW | POL | Piotr Wlodarczyk |
| 13 | DF | FRA | Jean-Sébastien Jaures |
| 15 | DF | FRA | Frédéric Jay |
| 16 | GK | FRA | Ronan Le Crom |

| No. | Pos. | Nation | Player |
|---|---|---|---|
| 17 | FW | POR | Hélder Esteves |
| 18 | MF | FRA | Lionel Mathis |
| 19 | MF | FRA | Nicolas Marin |
| 20 | FW | FRA | Arnaud Gonzalez |
| 21 | DF | FRA | Richard Suriano |
| 23 | MF | FRA | Olivier Kapo |
| 24 | DF | FRA | Cyrille Magnier |
| 25 | DF | FRA | David Recorbet |
| 25 | MF | FRA | David Vandenbossche |
| 26 | DF | CMR | Jean-Joel Perrier-Doumbé |
| 27 | MF | FRA | Pantxi Sirieix |
| 28 | DF | CHI | Pedro Reyes |
| 29 | DF | FRA | Éric Assati |
| 30 | GK | FRA | Jérémy Sopalski |

== Competitions ==
=== Overall record ===
| Competition | First match | Last match | Starting round | Final position | Record | | | | | | | |
| Competition | First match | Last match | Starting round | Final position | Pld | W | D | L | GF | GA | GD | Win % |
|---|---|---|---|---|---|---|---|---|---|---|---|---|
| Division 1 | 28 July 2001 | 4 May 2002 | Matchday 1 | 3rd | 34 | 16 | 11 | 7 | 48 | 38 | +10 | 47.06 |
| Coupe de France | 15 December 2001 | | Round of 64 | Round of 64 | 1 | 0 | 1 | 0 | 0 | 0 | +0 | 0.00 |
| Coupe de la Ligue | 1 December 2001 | 9 January 2002 | Round of 32 | Round of 16 | 2 | 1 | 0 | 1 | 3 | 1 | +2 | 50.00 |
| Total | | | | | 37 | 17 | 12 | 8 | 51 | 39 | +12 | 45.95 |

Source: Competitions

=== Division 1 ===
==== League table ====
| Pos | Team | Pld | W | D | L | GF | GA | GD | Pts | Qualification or relegation |
|---|---|---|---|---|---|---|---|---|---|---|
| 1 | Lyon (C) | 34 | 20 | 6 | 8 | 62 | 32 | +30 | 66 | Qualification to Champions League first group stage |
| 2 | Lens | 34 | 18 | 10 | 6 | 55 | 30 | +25 | 64 | Qualification to Champions League first group stage |
| 3 | Auxerre | 34 | 16 | 11 | 7 | 48 | 38 | +10 | 59 | Qualification to Champions League third qualifying round |
| 4 | Paris Saint-Germain | 34 | 15 | 13 | 6 | 43 | 24 | +19 | 58 | Qualification to UEFA Cup first round |
| 5 | Lille | 34 | 15 | 11 | 8 | 39 | 32 | +7 | 56 | Qualification to Intertoto Cup third round |

Source: Ligue 1
Rules for classification: 1) points; 2) goal difference; 3) number of goals scored.
(C) Champions

==== Results summary ====
| Overall | | | | | | | | Home | | | | | | Away | | | | | |
| Pld | W | D | L | GF | GA | GD | Pts | W | D | L | GF | GA | GD | W | D | L | GF | GA | GD |
|---|---|---|---|---|---|---|---|---|---|---|---|---|---|---|---|---|---|---|---|
| 38 | 25 | 8 | 5 | 58 | 25 | +33 | 83 | 17 | 1 | 1 | 34 | 7 | +27 | 8 | 7 | 4 | 24 | 18 | +6 |

==== Results by round ====
| Round | 1 | 2 | 3 | 4 | 5 | 6 | 7 | 8 | 9 | 10 | 11 | 12 | 13 | 14 | 15 | 16 | 17 | 18 | 19 | 20 | 21 | 22 | 23 | 24 | 25 | 26 | 27 | 28 | 29 | 30 | 31 | 32 | 33 | 34 |
|---|---|---|---|---|---|---|---|---|---|---|---|---|---|---|---|---|---|---|---|---|---|---|---|---|---|---|---|---|---|---|---|---|---|---|
| Ground | A | H | A | H | A | H | A | H | A | H | A | H | A | H | A | A | H | A | H | A | H | A | H | A | H | A | H | A | H | A | H | H | A | H |
| Result | W | D | W | W | D | W | W | D | D | L | D | W | L | W | L | W | W | D | D | D | L | D | W | D | W | W | W | L | W | W | L | W | D | L |
| Position | 1 | 3 | 2 | 2 | 3 | 1 | 2 | 1 | 2 | 4 | 4 | 3 | 4 | 3 | 4 | 4 | 3 | 3 | 3 | 3 | 4 | 4 | 4 | 4 | 4 | 3 | 3 | 4 | 4 | 4 | 4 | 3 | 3 | 3 |

A = Away; H = Home; W = Win; D = Draw; L = Loss

==== Matches ====
| 28 July 2001 1 | Rennes | 0–5 | Auxerre | Rennes |
| 20:00 | | | | Stadium: Stade de la Route de Lorient |

| 4 August 2001 2 | Auxerre | 1–1 | Paris Saint-Germain | Auxerre |
| 20:00 | | | | Stadium: Stade de l'Abbé-Deschamps |

| 12 August 2001 3 | Lorient | 0–1 | Auxerre | Lorient |
| 18:00 | | | | Stadium: Stade du Moustoir |

| 19 August 2001 4 | Auxerre | 2–1 | Sedan | Auxerre |
| 20:45 | | | | Stadium: Stade de l'Abbé-Deschamps |

| 25 August 2001 5 | Bordeaux | 1–1 | Auxerre | Bordeaux |
| 17:15 | | | | Stadium: Stade Chaban-Delmas |

| 8 September 2001 6 | Auxerre | 1–0 | Montpellier | Auxerre |
| 20:00 | | | | Stadium: Stade de l'Abbé-Deschamps |

| 15 September 2001 7 | Bastia | 0–1 | Auxerre | Furiani |
| 20:00 | | | | Stadium: Stade Armand Cesari |

| 22 September 2001 8 | Auxerre | 2–2 | Guingamp | Auxerre |
| 20:00 | | | | Stadium: Stade de l'Abbé-Deschamps |

| 29 September 2001 9 | Lens | 1–1 | Auxerre | Lens |
| 20:00 | | | | Stadium: Stade Félix Bollaert |

| 13 October 2001 10 | Auxerre | 1–3 | Troyes | Auxerre |
| 20:00 | | | | Stadium: Stade de l'Abbé-Deschamps |

| 20 October 2001 11 | Nantes | 2–2 | Auxerre | Nantes |
| 20:00 | | | | Stadium: Stade de la Beaujoire |

| 26 October 2001 12 | Auxerre | 2–0 | Marseille | Auxerre |
| 20:45 | | | | Stadium: Stade de l'Abbé-Deschamps |

| 4 November 2001 13 | Metz | 2–0 | Auxerre | Metz |
| 18:00 | | | | Stadium: Stade Saint-Symphorien |

| 17 November 2001 14 | Auxerre | 2–1 | Lille | Auxerre |
| 20:00 | | | | Stadium: Stade de l'Abbé-Deschamps |

| 25 November 2001 15 | Lyon | 3–0 | Auxerre | Lyon |
| 18:00 | | | | Stadium: Stade de Gerland |

| 28 November 2001 16 | Sochaux | 1–2 | Auxerre | Montbéliard |
| 20:30 | | | | Stadium: Stade Auguste Bonal |

| 8 December 2001 17 | Auxerre | 2–0 | Monaco | Auxerre |
| 17:15 | | | | Stadium: Stade de l'Abbé-Deschamps |

| 19 December 2001 18 | Paris Saint-Germain | 0–0 | Auxerre | Paris |
| 20:30 | | | | Stadium: Parc des Princes |

| 16 January 2002 19 | Auxerre | 2–2 | Lorient | Auxerre |
| 20:30 | | | | Stadium: Stade de l'Abbé-Deschamps |

| 23 January 2002 22 | Montpellier | 0–0 | Auxerre | Montpellier |
| 20:30 | | | | Stadium: Stade de la Mosson |

| 30 January 2002 23 | Auxerre | 1–0 | Bastia | Auxerre |
| 20:30 | | | | Stadium: Stade de l'Abbé-Deschamps |

| 2 February 2002 24 | Guingamp | 0–0 | Auxerre | Guingamp |
| 20:00 | | | | Stadium: Stade du Roudourou |

| 6 February 2002 25 | Auxerre | 1–0 | Lens | Auxerre |
| 20:30 | | | | Stadium: Stade de l'Abbé-Deschamps |

| 16 February 2002 26 | Troyes | 1–2 | Auxerre | Troyes |
| 20:00 | | | | Stadium: Stade de l'Aube |

| 23 February 2002 27 | Auxerre | 2–1 | Nantes | Auxerre |
| 20:00 | | | | Stadium: Stade de l'Abbé-Deschamps |

| 10 March 2002 21 | Auxerre | 0–1 | Bordeaux | Auxerre |
| 20:45 | | | | Stadium: Stade de l'Abbé-Deschamps |

| 16 March 2002 29 | Auxerre | 3–2 | Metz | Auxerre |
| 20:00 | | | | Stadium: Stade de l'Abbé-Deschamps |

| 23 March 2002 30 | Lille | 2–3 | Auxerre | Lille |
| 20:00 | | | | Stadium: Stade Grimonprez-Jooris |

| 1 April 2002 28 | Marseille | 3–0 | Auxerre | Marseille |
| 19:00 | | | | Stadium: Stade Vélodrome |

| 7 April 2002 31 | Auxerre | 0–1 | Lyon | Auxerre |
| 20:45 | | | | Stadium: Stade de l'Abbé-Deschamps |

| 13 April 2002 32 | Auxerre | 2–0 | Sochaux | Auxerre |
| 17:15 | | | | Stadium: Stade de l'Abbé-Deschamps |

| 21 April 2002 20 | Sedan | 3–3 | Auxerre | Sedan |
| 18:30 | | | | Stadium: Stade Louis Dugauguez |

| 27 April 2002 33 | Monaco | 1–1 | Auxerre | Monaco |
| 20:00 | | | | Stadium: Stade Louis II |

| 4 May 2002 34 | Auxerre | 2–3 | Rennes | Auxerre |
| 20:00 | | | | Stadium: Stade de l'Abbé-Deschamps |

=== Coupe de France ===
| 15 December 2001 Round of 64 | Saint-Priest | 0–0 (5–3 p) | Auxerre | Lyon |
| | | | | Stadium: Stade de Gerland |

=== Coupe de la Ligue ===
| 1 December 2001 Round of 32 | Laval | 0–3 | Auxerre | Laval |
| | | | | Stadium: Stade de Gerland |

| 9 January 2002 Round of 16 | Lorient | 1–0 | Auxerre | Lorient |
| | | | | Stadium: Stade du Moustoir |
