= 2005 Coupe de France final =

Final of the 2004–05 edition of the Coupe de France

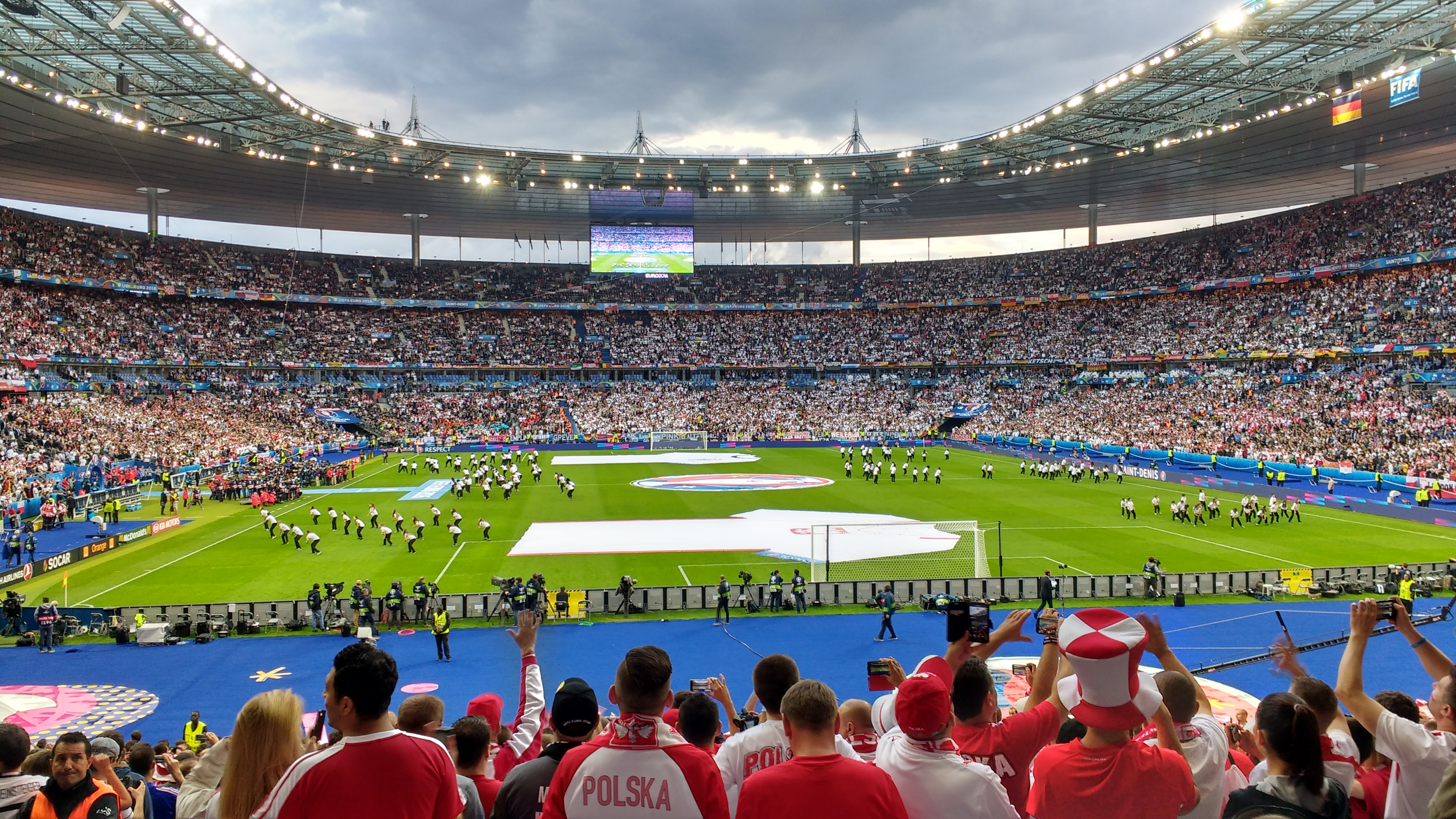
- Event: 2004–05 Coupe de France
Sedan	Auxerre
1	2
- Date: 4 June 2005
- Venue: Stade de France, Saint-Denis
- Referee: Bruno Derrien
- Attendance: 78,357

The 2005 Coupe de France final was a football match held at Stade de France, Saint-Denis, on 4 June 2005, that saw Auxerre defeat Sedan 2–1, winning on goals from Benjani and Bonaventure Kalou.

== Road to the final ==
Sedan			Round	Auxerre
Opponent	H/A	Result	2004–05 Coupe de France	Opponent	H/A	Result
Strasbourg	H	3–1	Round of 64	Calais	A	1–0
Montagnarde	H	4–0	Round of 32	Vannes	A	1–0
Quevilly	H	2–0	Round of 16	Paris SG	H	3–2
Grenoble	H	2–1 (a.e.t.)	Quarter-finals	Boulogne	A	2–1 (a.e.t.)
Monaco	A	1–0	Semi-finals	Nîmes	H	2–1

== Match details ==
4 June 2005
20:45

Sedan	1–2	Auxerre
Noro 63'		Benjani 37'; Kalou 90'

Stade de France, Saint-Denis
Attendance: 78,357
Referee: Bruno Derrien

Sedan	Auxerre

SEDAN:
GK	1	(France) Patrick Regnault
DF		(France) David Ducourtioux
DF		(Algeria) Nadir Belhadj
DF	4	(France) Jérémy Henin
DF		(France) Johann Charpenet (c)
DF		(Cameroon) Pierre Njanka	(substituted off) 89'
MF	7	(Cameroon) Marcus Mokaké	(substituted off) 58'
MF		(France) Didier Neumann
MF	9	(France) Stéphane Noro
FW		(France) Laurent Gagnier
FW		(France) Mickaël Citony
Substitutes:
FW	14	(France) Cédric Sabin	(substituted on) 58'
MF		(France) Albert Budak	(substituted on) 89'
Manager:
(France) Serge Romano Assistant Referees: Fourth Official:

AUXERRE:
GK	1	(France) Fabien Cool
DF	2	(France) Johan Radet	(substituted off) 60'
DF	3	(France) Jean-Sébastien Jaurès
DF	4	(France) Jean-Pascal Mignot
DF	5	(France) Younès Kaboul
MF	6	(France) Philippe Violeau
MF	7	(France) Benoît Cheyrou
MF	8	(France) Yann Lachuer (c)	(substituted off) 71'
MF	10	(France) Lionel Mathis
FW	9	(Zimbabwe) Benjani
FW	11	(Ivory Coast) Kanga Akalé
Substitutes:
GK		(France) Sébastien Hamel
DF		(Switzerland) Stéphane Grichting
DF		(France) Bacary Sagna	(substituted on) 60'
MF		(Finland) Teemu Tainio
FW		(Ivory Coast) Bonaventure Kalou	(substituted on) 71'
Manager:
(France) Guy Roux

== See also ==
- 2004–05 Coupe de France
