= 2003–04 AJ Auxerre season =

Auxerre
2003–04 season
- President: Jean-Claude Hamel
- Manager: Guy Roux
- Stadium: Stade de l'Abbé-Deschamps
- Ligue 1: 4th
- Coupe de France: Round of 16
- Coupe de la Ligue: Semi-finals
- UEFA Cup: Fourth round
- Top goalscorer: League: Djibril Cissé (26); All: Djibril Cissé (30)
- Average home league attendance: 12,323

The 2003–04 season was the 98th season in the existence of AJ Auxerre and the club's 23rd consecutive season in the top flight of French football. In addition to the domestic league, Auxerre participated in this season's editions of the Coupe de France, Coupe de la Ligue, and UEFA Cup. The season covered the period from 1 July 2003 to 30 June 2004.

== Competitions ==
=== Overall record ===
Competition	First match	Last match	Starting round	Final position	Record							
Competition	First match	Last match	Starting round	Final position	Pld	W	D	L	GF	GA	GD	Win %
Ligue 1	2 August 2003	23 May 2004	Matchday 1	4th	38	19	8	11	60	34	+26	50.00
Coupe de France	3 January 2004	10 February 2004	Round of 64	Round of 16	3	2	0	1	4	1	+3	66.67
Coupe de la Ligue	28 October 2003	3 February 2004	First round	Semi-finals	4	3	1	0	5	0	+5	75.00
UEFA Cup	24 September 2003	25 March 2004	First round	Fourth round	8	4	3	1	8	4	+4	50.00
Total					53	28	12	13	77	39	+38	52.83

Source: Competitions

=== Ligue 1 ===
==== League table ====
Pos	Team	Pld	W	D	L	GF	GA	GD	Pts	Qualification or relegation
2	Paris Saint-Germain	38	22	10	6	50	28	+22	76	Qualification to Champions League group stage
3	Monaco	38	21	12	5	59	30	+29	75	Qualification to Champions League third qualifying round
4	Auxerre	38	19	8	11	60	34	+26	65	Qualification to UEFA Cup first round
5	Sochaux	38	18	9	11	54	42	+12	63	Qualification to UEFA Cup first round
6	Nantes	38	17	9	12	47	35	+12	60	Qualification to Intertoto Cup third round

Source: Ligue 1
Rules for classification: 1) points; 2) goal difference; 3) number of goals scored.

==== Results summary ====
Overall								Home						Away					
Pld	W	D	L	GF	GA	GD	Pts	W	D	L	GF	GA	GD	W	D	L	GF	GA	GD
38	19	8	11	60	34	+26	65	13	3	3	38	15	+23	6	5	8	22	19	+3

==== Results by round ====
Round	1	2	3	4	5	6	7	8	9	10	11	12	13	14	15	16	17	18	19	20	21	22	23	24	25	26	27	28	29	30	31	32	33	34	35	36	37	38
Ground	H	A	H	A	H	A	H	A	H	A	H	A	H	A	A	H	A	H	A	H	A	H	A	H	A	H	A	H	A	H	A	H	H	A	H	A	H	A
Result	L	L	W	L	W	D	W	L	W	D	L	W	W	W	L	W	W	W	L	W	W	W	W	L	D	D	L	D	L	W	D	W	W	L	D	W	W	D
Position	15	18	15	17	15	15	9	13	8	9	12	11	7	6	7	7	5	5	6	5	4	3	2	4	4	5	5	5	5	5	5	5	4	5	5	4	4	4

A = Away; H = Home; W = Win; D = Draw; L = Loss

==== Matches ====
2 August 2003 1	Auxerre	1–2	Nice	Auxerre
20:00				Stadium: Stade de l'Abbé-Deschamps; Attendance: 16,673

8 August 2003 2	Marseille	1–0	Auxerre	Marseille
20:45				Stadium: Stade Vélodrome; Attendance: 55,840

16 August 2003 3	Auxerre	3–2	Strasbourg	Auxerre
17:15				Stadium: Stade de l'Abbé-Deschamps; Attendance: 12,272

23 August 2003 4	Bordeaux	2–0	Auxerre	Bordeaux
17:15				Stadium: Stade Chaban-Delmas; Attendance: 27,418

30 August 2003 5	Auxerre	2–1	Rennes	Auxerre
20:00				Stadium: Stade de l'Abbé-Deschamps; Attendance: 9,789

13 September 2003 6	Lyon	1–1	Auxerre	Lyon
17:15				Stadium: Stade de Gerland; Attendance: 38,321

20 September 2003 7	Auxerre	2–1	Bastia	Auxerre
20:00				Stadium: Stade de l'Abbé-Deschamps; Attendance: 10,067

27 September 2003 8	Paris Saint-Germain	1–0	Auxerre	Paris
20:00				Stadium: Parc des Princes; Attendance: 39,777

4 October 2003 9	Auxerre	3–0	Lille	Auxerre
20:00				Stadium: Stade de l'Abbé-Deschamps; Attendance: 9,836

18 October 2003 10	Monaco	1–1	Auxerre	Monaco
17:30				Stadium: Stade Louis II; Attendance: 8,804

25 October 2003 11	Auxerre	0–1	Montpellier	Auxerre
20:00				Stadium: Stade de l'Abbé-Deschamps; Attendance: 9,763

1 November 2003 12	Toulouse	0–3	Auxerre	Toulouse
20:00				Stadium: Stade de Toulouse; Attendance: 27,529

9 November 2003 13	Auxerre	3–0	Guingamp	Auxerre
18:00				Stadium: Stade de l'Abbé-Deschamps; Attendance: 9,103

22 November 2003 14	Metz	0–2	Auxerre	Metz
20:00				Stadium: Stade Saint-Symphorien; Attendance: 20,106

30 November 2003 15	Sochaux	3–2	Auxerre	Montbéliard
18:00				Stadium: Stade Auguste Bonal; Attendance: 17,796

3 December 2003 16	Auxerre	1–0	Le Mans	Auxerre
19:00				Stadium: Stade de l'Abbé-Deschamps; Attendance: 10,782

6 December 2003 17	Ajaccio	1–2	Auxerre	Ajaccio
20:00				Stadium: Stade François Coty; Attendance: 3,085

13 December 2003 18	Auxerre	2–0	Lens	Auxerre
20:00				Stadium: Stade de l'Abbé-Deschamps; Attendance: 11,909

20 December 2003 19	Nantes	1–0	Auxerre	Nantes
20:00				Stadium: Stade de la Beaujoire; Attendance: 29,446

10 January 2004 20	Auxerre	2–0	Marseille	Auxerre
20:00				Stadium: Stade de l'Abbé-Deschamps; Attendance: 21,112

17 January 2004 21	Strasbourg	0–2	Auxerre	Strasbourg
20:00				Stadium: Stade de la Meinau; Attendance: 14,912

31 January 2004 22	Auxerre	5–0	Bordeaux	Auxerre
17:15				Stadium: Stade de l'Abbé-Deschamps; Attendance: 10,894

7 February 2004 23	Rennes	0–2	Auxerre	Rennes
20:00				Stadium: Stade de la Route de Lorient; Attendance: 18,484

15 February 2004 24	Auxerre	1–2	Lyon	Auxerre
20:45				Stadium: Stade de l'Abbé-Deschamps; Attendance: 14,436

21 February 2004 25	Bastia	1–1	Auxerre	Furiani
20:00				Stadium: Stade Armand Cesari; Attendance: 5,256

29 February 2004 26	Auxerre	1–1	Paris Saint-Germain	Auxerre
20:45				Stadium: Stade de l'Abbé-Deschamps; Attendance: 17,174

6 March 2004 27	Lille	1–0	Auxerre	Lille
17:15				Stadium: Stade Grimonprez-Jooris; Attendance: 14,198

14 March 2004 28	Auxerre	0–0	Monaco	Auxerre
20:45				Stadium: Stade de l'Abbé-Deschamps; Attendance: 16,215

20 March 2004 29	Montpellier	1–0	Auxerre	Montpellier
20:00				Stadium: Stade de la Mosson; Attendance: 13,179

28 March 2004 30	Auxerre	3–2	Toulouse	Auxerre
18:30				Stadium: Stade de l'Abbé-Deschamps; Attendance: 7,633

4 April 2004 31	Guingamp	2–2	Auxerre	Guingamp
20:45				Stadium: Stade de Roudourou; Attendance: 15,374

10 April 2004 32	Auxerre	2–1	Metz	Auxerre
20:00				Stadium: Stade de l'Abbé-Deschamps; Attendance: 10,323

24 April 2004 33	Auxerre	2–1	Sochaux	Auxerre
20:00				Stadium: Stade de l'Abbé-Deschamps; Attendance: 18,4912

1 May 2004 34	Le Mans	2–1	Auxerre	Le Mans
20:00				Stadium: Stade Léon-Bollée; Attendance: 15,059

8 May 2004 35	Auxerre	1–1	Ajaccio	Auxerre
20:00				Stadium: Stade de l'Abbé-Deschamps; Attendance: 8,710

11 May 2004 36	Lens	1–3	Auxerre	Lens
18:15				Stadium: Stade Félix Bollaert; Attendance: 31,249

15 May 2004 37	Auxerre	2–0	Nantes	Auxerre
20:00				Stadium: Stade de l'Abbé-Deschamps; Attendance: 19,587

23 May 2004 38	Nice	1–1	Auxerre	Nice
20:00				Stadium: Stade du Ray; Attendance: 10,895

=== Coupe de France ===
3 January 2004 Round of 64	Auxerre	2–0	Sochaux	Auxerre
20:30				Stadium: Stade de l'Abbé Deschamps; Attendance: 5,803; Referee: Stéphane Bré

24 January 2004 Round of 32	Auxerre	2–0	Montpellier	Auxerre
15:00				Stadium: Stade de l'Abbé Deschamps; Attendance: 7,342; Referee: Pascal Garibian

10 February 2004 Round of 16	ESA Brive	1–0	Auxerre	Brive-la-Gaillarde
18:00				Stadium: Stade André Pestourie; Attendance: 13,222; Referee: Bertrand Layec

=== Coupe de la Ligue ===
28 October 2003 First round	Auxerre	1–0	Rennes	Auxerre
20:00				Stadium: Stade de l'Abbé Deschamps; Attendance: 5,007; Referee: Pascal Viléo

17 December 2003 Round of 16	Troyes	0–3	Auxerre	Troyes
19:00				Stadium: Stade de l'Aube; Attendance: 8,135; Referee: Claude Colombo

14 January 2004 Quarter-finals	Gueugnon	0–1	Auxerre	Gueugnon
19:00				Stadium: Stade Jean Laville; Attendance: 11,974; Referee: Claude Colombo

3 February 2004 Semi-finals	Nantes	0–0 (a.e.t.) (5–4 p)	Auxerre	Nantes
21:00				Stadium: Stade de la Beaujoire; Attendance: 26,971; Referee: Laurent Duhamel

=== UEFA Cup ===
==== First round ====
24 September 2003 First leg	Auxerre (France)	1–0	(Switzerland) Neuchâtel Xamax	Auxerre, France
20:45	Kalou 6'	Report		Stadium: Stade Abbé-Deschamps; Attendance: 6,155; Referee: Anton Genov (Bulgaria)

15 October 2003 Second leg	Neuchâtel Xamax (Switzerland)	0–1 (0–2 agg.)	(France) Auxerre	Neuchâtel, Switzerland
20:15		Report	Lachuer 53'	Stadium: La Maladière; Attendance: 5,585; Referee: Andy D'Urso (England)

==== Second round ====
6 November 2003 First leg	Utrecht (Netherlands)	0–0	(France) Auxerre	Utrecht, Netherlands
18:30		Report		Stadium: Stadion Galgenwaard; Attendance: 16,251; Referee: Leslie Irvine (Northern Ireland)

27 November 2003 Second leg	Auxerre (France)	4–0 (4–0 agg.)	(Netherlands) Utrecht	Auxerre, France
20:30	Cissé 22', 48'; Kapo 29'; Kalou 56'	Report		Stadium: Stade Abbé-Deschamps; Attendance: 8,823; Referee: Karel Vidlak (Czech Republic)

==== Third round ====
26 February 2004 First leg	Auxerre (France)	0–0	(Greece) Panathinaikos	Auxerre, France
20:00		Report		Stadium: Stade Abbé-Deschamps; Attendance: 12,388; Referee: Stuart Dougal (Scotland)

3 March 2004 Second leg	Panathinaikos (Greece)	0–1 (0–1 agg.)	(France) Auxerre	Athens, Greece
20:30		Report	Kalou 71'	Stadium: Leoforos Alexandras Stadium; Attendance: 12,262; Referee: Florian Meyer (Germany)

==== Fourth round ====
11 March 2004 First leg	Auxerre (France)	1–1	(Netherlands) PSV Eindhoven	Auxerre, France
20:30	Tainio 36'	Report	Lucius 71'	Stadium: Stade Abbé-Deschamps; Attendance: 17,500; Referee: Massimo Busacca (Switzerland)

25 March 2004 Second leg	PSV Eindhoven (Netherlands)	3–0 (4–1 agg.)	(France) Auxerre	Eindhoven, Netherlands
20:30	Kežman 4', 27'; Van Bommel 73'	Report		Stadium: Philips Stadion; Attendance: 21,000; Referee: Graham Poll (England)
