= Budak (surname) =

Budak is a surname. Notable people with the surname include:

- Albert Budak (born 1985), French footballer
- Ayşenur Budak (born 2003), Turkish female judoka
- Gökhan Budak (1968–2013), Turkish physicist
- İsmail Budak (born 1992), German footballer
- Mile Budak (1889–1945), Croatian politician and writer
- Mehmet Budak (born 1980), Turkish footballer
- Neven Budak (born 1957), Croatian historian and professor
