= Budak =

Budak may refer to:

- Budak (surname)
- Budak, Lice, a settlement near Diyarbakir, Turkey
- Budak, Lika-Senj County, a village in Croatia
- Budak, Zadar County, a village in Croatia
