= Olivier Kapo =

French footballer (born 1980)

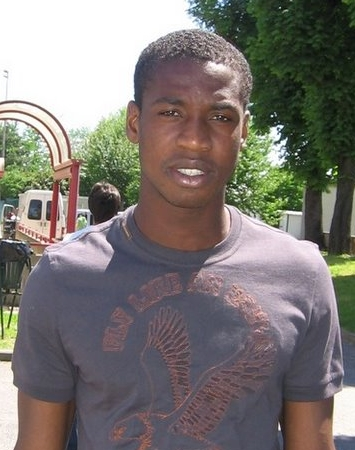
- Kapo in 2005

Personal information
- Full name: Obou Narcisse Olivier Kapo
- Date of birth: 27 September 1980 (age 46)
- Place of birth: Marcory, Ivory Coast
- Height: 1.84 m (6 ft 0 in)
- Positions: Attacking midfielder; left winger

Youth career
- 1996–1999: Auxerre

Senior career*
| Years | Team | Apps | (Gls) |
| 1999–2004 | Auxerre | 120 | (19) |
| 2004–2007 | Juventus | 14 | (0) |
| 2005–2006 | → Monaco (loan) | 25 | (5) |
| 2006–2007 | → Levante (loan) | 30 | (5) |
| 2007–2008 | Birmingham City | 26 | (5) |
| 2008–2010 | Wigan Athletic | 20 | (1) |
| 2010 | → Boulogne (loan) | 16 | (2) |
| 2010–2011 | Celtic | 2 | (0) |
| 2011 | Al-Ahly | 5 | (2) |
| 2012–2013 | Auxerre | 40 | (12) |
| 2013–2014 | Levadiakos | 19 | (2) |
| 2014–2015 | Korona Kielce | 27 | (7) |
| 2014 | Korona Kielce II | 3 | (1) |
| Total | | 347 | (61) |

International career
| 2002–2004 | France | 9 | (3) |
Medal record
Men's football
Representing France
FIFA Confederations Cup
| Winner | 2003 |
- * Club domestic league appearances and goals

Obou Narcisse Olivier Kapo (born 27 September 1980), known as Olivier Kapo, is a French former professional footballer who played as an attacking midfielder or left winger.

== Early life ==
Born in Marcory, Ivory Coast, Kapo acquired French nationality by naturalization on 3 November 1998.

== Club career ==
=== Early career ===
He began his professional career with Auxerre in 1999. He joined Juventus on a free transfer in the summer of 2004, but he struggled to adapt to life in Turin and did not play much as he was behind Pavel Nedvěd in the left midfield role. As a result, he was loaned to Monaco for the 2005–06 season.

When Juventus were forcibly relegated to Serie B, Kapo returned to Turin, but went back on loan due to the abundance of midfielders. He signed for Spanish La Liga club Levante, scoring five goals in 32 appearances.

=== Birmingham City ===
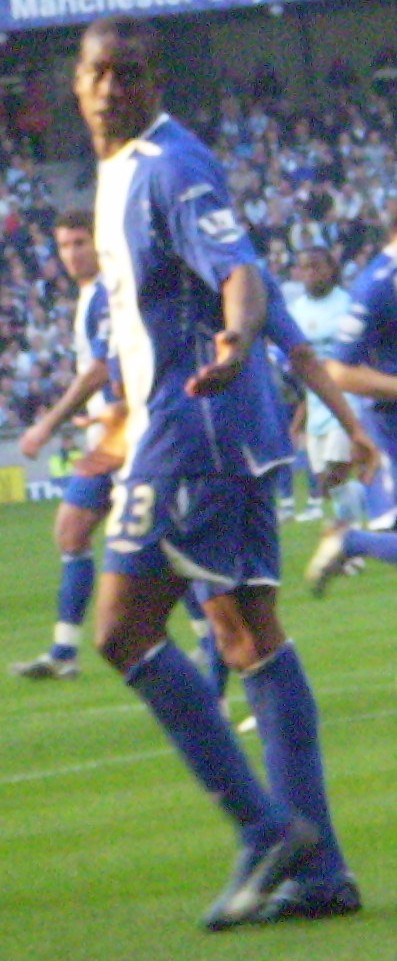
Kapo playing for Birmingham City in 2007

Kapo signed for Birmingham City on 29 June 2007 for a fee of £3 million. He claimed to have rejected other offers to sign for the club, suggesting his style of play was better suited to English football. He scored on his Premier League debut, against Chelsea in a 3–2 defeat on 12 August 2007.

=== Wigan Athletic ===
Kapo signed for Wigan Athletic on 16 July 2008, signing a three-year deal for a fee reported as £3.5 million, a move which reunited him with former manager Steve Bruce. He scored his first goal for Wigan in a 4–1 League Cup win over Ipswich Town on 24 September 2008, and his first league goal in a 2–1 defeat to Chelsea on 28 February 2009. On 8 January 2010, Kapo moved to Boulogne on a six-month loan deal, and left Wigan by mutual consent in August 2010.

=== Celtic ===
On 4 November 2010, Kapo signed for Celtic on an 18-month deal. He was allocated the number 77 jersey. He stated he turned down better money from other clubs to sign for the Glasgow side, including an offer from Bundesliga club SC Freiburg. He was encouraged to join the club after consulting with his friend, ex-Celtic player Jean-Joël Perrier-Doumbé. Kapo made his debut against St Johnstone at home in the Scottish Premier League as a second-half substitute, hitting the bar and then assisting the second goal in a 2–0 victory. He was released from his Celtic contract in January 2011, although the player claimed he walked out on the club because they had unilaterally changed the terms of his contract.

=== Al Ahli SC ===
In February 2011, Kapo signed for Qatar club Al Ahli SC on a five-month contract. He scored twice to help Al Ahli to only their second win of the season, beating Qatar SC 3–1.

=== Return to Auxerre ===
He signed an 18-month contract with former club Auxerre in January 2012, after a few weeks spent training with the club.

=== Levadiakos FC ===
When his contract expired, Kapo signed a two-year deal with Super League Greece club Levadiakos. In September 2014, he stated in the French media that "everything is corrupted in Greek football, mafia-controlled, while FIFA and UEFA simply don't care".

=== Korona Kielce ===
On 15 August 2014, Kapo signed a one-year contract with the Polish Ekstraklasa side Korona Kielce. He scored his first goal for Korona in the matchday 12, as his team drew 2–2 with Lech Poznań. In total, he scored seven goals. After the 2014–15 Ekstraklasa season, his contract was not extended.

== International career ==
He won nine caps for France. He represented his country in the 2003 Confederations Cup, scoring against New Zealand, and was a substitute in the final as France beat Cameroon. He has also scored in friendlies against Egypt and Serbia and Montenegro. Kapo's last cap came in 2004.

== Personal life ==
His nephew, Maxen, is a footballer who turned professional with Paris Saint-Germain and made his senior debut with Lausanne-Sport.

== Career statistics ==
=== Club ===
Appearances and goals by club, season and competition
| Club | Season | League | | | Cup (Note: Includes Coupe de France, Coupe de la Ligue, Coppa Italia, FA Cup, EFL Cup and Copa del Rey.) | | Continental (Note: Includes UEFA Champions League, UEFA Cup and UEFA Intertoto-Cup.) | | Total | |
| Club | Season | Division | Apps | Goals | Apps | Goals | Apps | Goals | Apps | Goals |
|---|---|---|---|---|---|---|---|---|---|---|
| Auxerre | 1998–99 | Division 1 | 1 | 0 | 2 | 0 | — | | 3 | 0 |
| Auxerre | 1999–2000 | Division 1 | 15 | 3 | 2 | 0 | – | | 17 | 3 |
| Auxerre | 2000–01 | Division 1 | 29 | 4 | 5 | 0 | 8 | 1 | 42 | 5 |
| Auxerre | 2001–02 | Division 1 | 25 | 4 | 2 | 0 | — | | 27 | 4 |
| Auxerre | 2002–03 | Ligue 1 | 21 | 6 | 2 | 0 | 8 | 1 | 31 | 7 |
| Auxerre | 2003–04 | Ligue 1 | 29 | 2 | 7 | 1 | 5 | 1 | 41 | 4 |
| Auxerre | Total | | 120 | 19 | 20 | 1 | 21 | 3 | 160 | 23 |
| Juventus | 2004–05 | Serie A | 14 | 0 | 2 | 0 | 3 | 0 | 19 | 0 |
| Monaco (loan) | 2005–06 | Ligue 1 | 25 | 5 | 1 | 0 | 6 | 2 | 32 | 7 |
| Levante (loan) | 2006–07 | Primera División | 30 | 5 | 2 | 0 | — | | 32 | 5 |
| Birmingham | 2007–08 | Premier League | 26 | 5 | — | | — | | 26 | 5 |
| Wigan | 2008–09 | Premier League | 19 | 1 | 2 | 0 | — | | 21 | 1 |
| Wigan | 2009–10 | Premier League | 1 | 0 | — | | — | | 1 | 0 |
| Wigan | Total | | 20 | 1 | 2 | 0 | 0 | 0 | 22 | 1 |
| Boulogne (loan) | 2009–10 | Ligue 1 | 16 | 2 | 1 | 0 | — | | 17 | 2 |
| Celtic | 2010–11 | SPL | 2 | 0 | — | | — | | 2 | 0 |
| Al Ahli | 2010–11 | Stars League | 5 | 2 | — | | — | | 5 | 2 |
| Auxerre | 2011–12 | Ligue 1 | 15 | 4 | — | | — | | 15 | 4 |
| Auxerre | 2012–13 | Ligue 2 | 25 | 8 | 2 | 0 | — | | 27 | 8 |
| Auxerre | Total | | 40 | 12 | 2 | 0 | 0 | 0 | 42 | 12 |
| Levadiakos | 2013–14 | Super League | 19 | 2 | — | | — | | 19 | 2 |
| Korona Kielce | 2014–15 | Ekstraklasa | 27 | 7 | 0 | 0 | — | | 27 | 7 |
| Korona Kielce II | 2014–15 | III liga | 3 | 1 | — | | — | | 3 | 1 |
| Career total | | | 347 | 61 | 30 | 1 | 30 | 5 | 407 | 67 |

=== International ===
Appearances and goals by national team and year
| National team | Year | Apps | Goals |
|---|---|---|---|
| France | 2002 | 2 | 1 |
| France | 2003 | 5 | 2 |
| France | 2004 | 2 | 0 |
| Total | | 9 | 3 |

Scores and results list France's goal tally first, score column indicates score after each Kapo goal.

List of international goals scored by Olivier Kapo
| No. | Date | Venue | Opponent | Score | Result | Competition | Ref. |
|---|---|---|---|---|---|---|---|
| 1 | 20 November 2002 | Stade de France, Paris, France | Serbia and Montenegro | 3–0 | 3–0 | Friendly | |
| 2 | 30 April 2003 | Stade de France, Paris, France | Egypt | 5–0 | 5–0 | Friendly | |
| 3 | 22 June 2003 | Stade de France, Paris, France | New Zealand | 1–0 | 5–0 | 2003 FIFA Confederations Cup | |

== Honours ==
Auxerre

- Coupe de France: 2002–03

France

- FIFA Confederations Cup: 2003
