= Mangué Cissé =

Ivorian footballer

Personal information
- Full name: Mangué Cissé Djibrila
- Date of birth: 17 November 1945
- Place of birth: Abidjan, Ivory Coast
- Date of death: 30 September 2009 (aged 63)
- Place of death: Abidjan, Ivory Coast
- Position: Defender

Senior career*
Years	Team	Apps	(Gls)
- ASEC Mimosas
- FC Martigues
1978–1979	AC Arles-Avignon	31	(0)

International career
- Ivory Coast
- * Club domestic league appearances and goals

Mangué Cissé Djibrila (17 November 1945 – 30 September 2009) was an Ivorian footballer who played as a defender. In 1970 he reached to semi-final of the Africa Cup of Nations. He died on 30 September 2009 after long-term disease. He had seven children, the youngest of whom is French international, Djibril Cissé.
