= Djibril Cissé =

French footballer (born 1981)

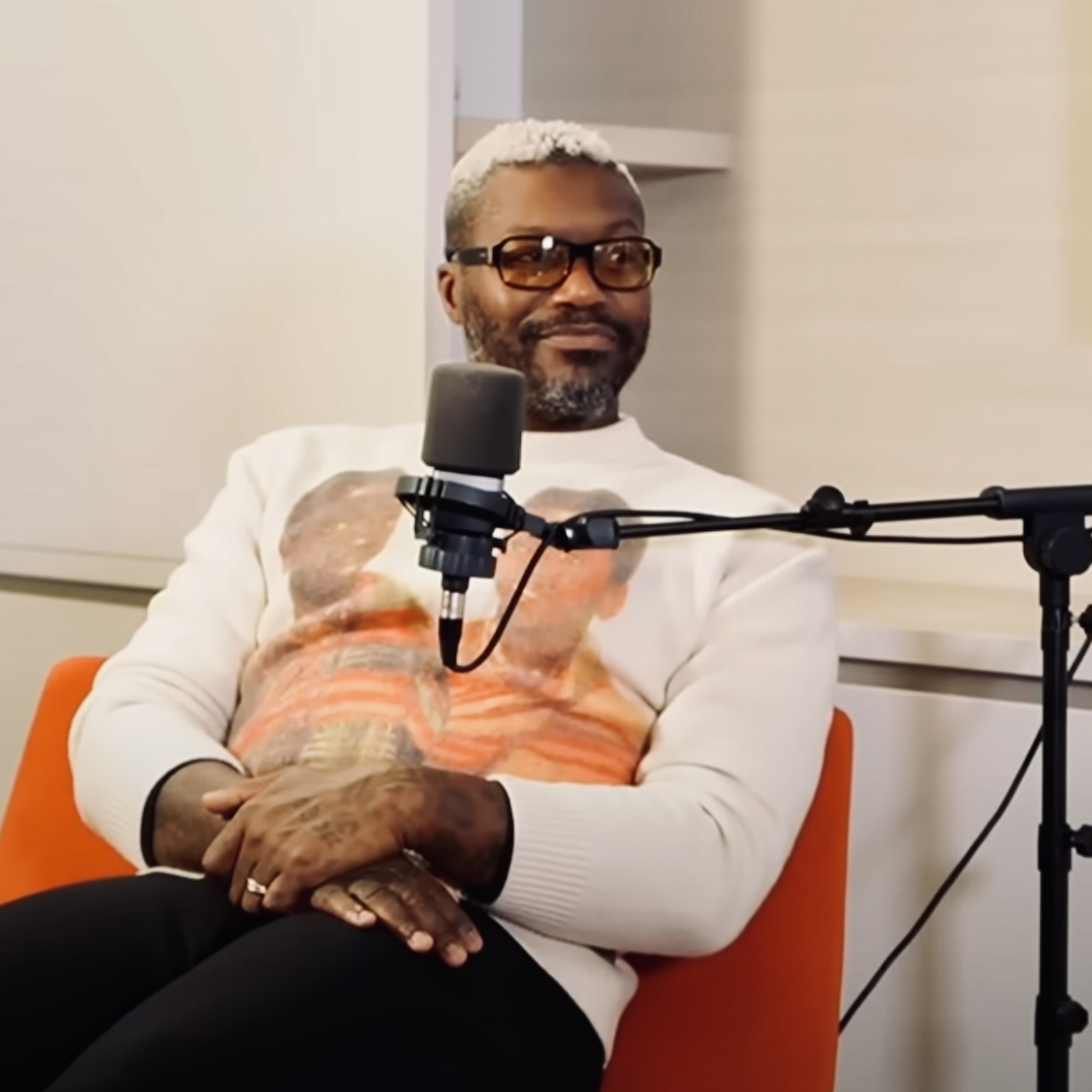
- Cissé in 2024

Personal information
- Full name: Djibril Cissé
- Date of birth: 12 August 1981 (age 45)
- Place of birth: Arles, France
- Height: 1.83 m (6 ft 0 in)
- Position: Forward

Youth career
- 1989–1996: Arles-Avignon
- 1996: Nîmes
- 1996–1998: Auxerre

Senior career*
Years	Team	Apps	(Gls)
1998–2004	Auxerre	128	(70)
2004–2007	Liverpool	49	(13)
2006–2007	→ Marseille (loan)	21	(8)
2007–2009	Marseille	37	(16)
2008–2009	→ Sunderland (loan)	35	(10)
2009–2011	Panathinaikos	61	(47)
2011–2012	Lazio	18	(1)
2012–2013	Queens Park Rangers	26	(9)
2013	→ Al-Gharafa (loan)	9	(1)
2013	Kuban Krasnodar	15	(4)
2014–2015	Bastia	23	(2)
2015	Saint-Pierroise	1	(0)
2017–2018	Yverdon	29	(23)
2018–2019	AC Vicenza 1902		
2021	Panathinaikos Chicago	0	(0)
Total		452	(205)

International career
1998–2002	France U21	4	(6)
2002–2011	France	41	(9)
- * Club domestic league appearances and goals

Djibril Cissé (born 12 August 1981) is a French former professional footballer who played as a forward.

Cissé started his career at his boyhood club Arles-Avignon in 1989, before playing for the youth teams at Nîmes and Auxerre. Cissé spent two years in the youth system at Auxerre, before graduating to the first team in 1998. After playing for Auxerre for six seasons, scoring 90 goals in 166 appearances, he moved to Premier League club Liverpool in 2004.

During his time at Anfield, Cissé played 79 games, scoring 24 times and winning the 2004–05 UEFA Champions League and 2005–06 FA Cup. He went on to play in Greece with Panathinaikos, Italy with Lazio, Qatar with Al-Gharafa, Russia with Kuban Krasnodar and Switzerland with Yverdon Sport. He also had further spells in English football with Sunderland and Queens Park Rangers, and France with Marseille and Bastia. In 2015, Cissé made one appearance for Réunion based club Saint-Pierroise, before retiring from professional football. In the course of his career, Cissé suffered from two leg breaks, breaking his left leg in 2004, and his right leg in 2006.

Cissé played for the France national football team at the 2002 and 2010 FIFA World Cups, and was also part of les Bleus' 2003 FIFA Confederations Cup winning squad.

== Club career ==
=== Auxerre ===
After starting his career with Nîmes, Cissé signed for Auxerre at the age of 15. Playing for the youth team in 1999, Cissé won the Coupe Gambardella, the equivalent of the FA Youth Cup. After being promoted to the first team squad by coach Guy Roux, Cissé made his Ligue 1 debut at the age of 17 as a substitute against Paris Saint-Germain on 20 March 1999. His first goal came at the start of the 2000–01 season in a 2–1 defeat of Metz. He ended this season, his first as a regular in the first team, with eight goals from 25 games.

In the 2001–02 season, Cissé was the top scorer in Ligue 1 with 22 goals from 29 matches, as Auxerre finished in third place and qualified for the 2002–03 UEFA Champions League. Cissé's form saw him make his debut for the France national team and earn a place in the team's squad for the 2002 FIFA World Cup.

Cissé was again amongst the league's top scorers in 2002–03 with 14 goals. He also scored six goals in six matches in Auxerre's successful Coupe de France campaign, including both goals in the semi-final defeat of Rennes and the equaliser in the 2003 Coupe de France Final victory over PSG.

2003–04 proved to be Cissé's most successful goalscoring season, with 30 goals in all competitions, including 26 in Ligue 1 to win the golden boot for the second time.

Overall, Cissé scored 70 goals in 128 league games for Auxerre, before signing for Liverpool in a deal worth over £14 million in the summer of 2004.

=== Liverpool ===
At Liverpool, Cissé scored five goals in 24 first-team games in all competitions for Liverpool in the 2004–05 season. He had only played 19 games for Liverpool when a freak accident occurred while playing against Blackburn Rovers on 30 October 2004. While Cissé and Blackburn's Jay McEveley were challenging for the ball, Cissé's boot got caught in the turf and his leg snapped. This resulted in a broken tibia and fibula, and physio Daryl Martin said "It could take six to nine months for a recovery and the absolute worst-case scenario is 18 months..." Cissé later stated that had it not been for prompt attention from the trainers at the stadium, he could have lost the leg below the knee. He had pins inserted in the leg, and was expected to be out of action for the rest of the 2004–05 season.

However, in an unexpected return, Cissé was able to come on as a 75th-minute substitute in the second leg of Liverpool's Champions League quarter-final tie with Juventus on 13 April 2005. He went on to score both Liverpool goals in their last Premiership match of the season, a 2–1 win over Aston Villa and also converted a penalty in Liverpool's penalty shootout win over AC Milan in the Champions League final. During the 2005–06 season, Liverpool manager Rafael Benítez deployed Cissé on the right wing on numerous occasions. While his pace made him well suited to such a role, it was doubtful whether he would be happy to continue in this role rather than in his preferred position as striker. He scored two goals as Liverpool won the 2005 UEFA Super Cup. Cissé also scored Liverpool's opening goal in the 2006 FA Cup Final with a sliding shot past West Ham United keeper Shaka Hislop. Liverpool went on to win 3–1 on penalties. He ended the 2005–06 season with 19 goals in all competitions.

=== Marseille ===
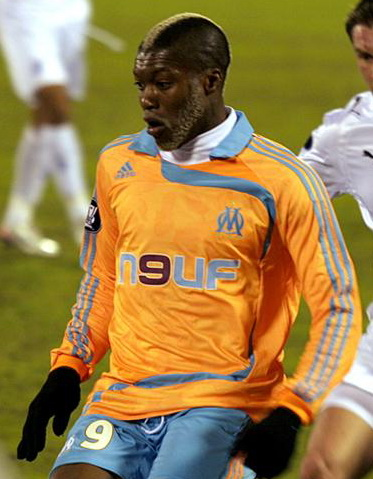
Cissé playing for Marseille

From the summer of 2005, the media had linked Cissé with a move away from Anfield. Speculation intensified as the season went on. In early June 2006, it was reported that a transfer to Marseille had been agreed. The very same day, Cissé broke his leg during France's final warm up match against China on 7 June 2006. It was thought that even though a relatively quick recovery was expected, Cissé's transfer would be postponed until at least the January transfer window. However, the two teams agreed a loan deal in July 2006.

Cissé made his return to training on 20 October 2006, and scored his first goal for Marseille on 22 December 2006 when they beat Saint-Étienne 2–1. With only four goals in 14 appearances by April, Cissé's performances were drawing such criticism that former player Jean-Pierre Papin urged Cissé's critics to be more patient while the striker recovered from his career-threatening injury. Despite the slow start, Cissé managed to score 4 goals in his final 7 league appearances to finish with 8 goals in 21 league appearances, helping Marseille to finish 2nd in the 2006–07 season and guarantee a Champions League place for the 2007–08 season. On 12 May 2007, he scored two goals in the French Cup Final against Sochaux, although Marseille still lost the match 5–4 on penalties, after a 2–2 stalemate after extra time following a late equaliser by another Liverpool player on loan Anthony Le Tallec.

On 7 July 2007, Marseille's president Pape Diouf announced that the club had struck a deal with Liverpool to sign Cissé permanently, for an estimated fee of €8 million. But subsequently, Cissé was linked with a return to the English Premier League with Blackburn Rovers, Wigan Athletic, Tottenham Hotspur, Portsmouth and Bolton Wanderers said to be interested. Manchester City had their approach for Cissé rejected by Marseille boss, who said, "He is wanted, that is for sure, I myself have been approached by Manchester City (about Cissé), but I turned it down categorically". On 26 January 2008, Cissé scored a hat-trick in Marseille's 6–1 win against Caen.

=== Sunderland ===
On 20 August 2008, Cissé secured a loan switch to Premier League club Sunderland. At the same ground where he had scored on his Liverpool debut, Cissé scored the winning header on his debut against Tottenham to make it 2–1 to Sunderland. A few days later, Cissé announced his desire to secure a permanent deal with the club. Manager Roy Keane also expressed his desire to sign Cissé, telling The News of the World: "I'd be happy to break the transfer record if Djibril's doing the business". In the Tyne-Wear derby, Cissé scored his third Sunderland goal on 25 October 2008, with Sunderland winning 2–1. After scoring in a 4–1 victory against Hull, Cissé stated that despite the departure of Roy Keane from Sunderland, he still wished to complete a permanent move to the club.

On 18 April 2009, Cissé scored his tenth league goal of the season in a 1–0 victory over Hull City at the Stadium of Light. On 24 May, it was confirmed that Sunderland would not be taking up the option to sign Cissé permanently, and he subsequently returned to Marseille.

=== Panathinaikos ===
On 25 June 2009, Cissé signed a four-year contract with Panathinaikos. It was reported that the player would earn €2.5 million per year, while French club Marseille would get an estimated €8 million as a transfer fee. The total cost of the transfer is about €20 million, taking into account the various bonuses. He scored his first goal in Greece against Ergotelis and soon he became the new leader of the team. He was the Superleague topscorer for the 2009–10, leading his team to win the double. In his first year in Greece, Cissé scored 23 goals in 28 matches.

Cissé's performances made Panathinaikos fans love him. He had stated that after making the double in Greece he would love to play again in the Champions League with Panathinaikos and looking for a successful season also in Greece. On 30 October 2010, he scored two goals (one penalty) in the Derby of the eternal enemies against arch-rivals Olympiacos in a 2–1 home win. At the MVP award ceremony for the eighth fixture, Cissé said: "I am not only a player of Panathinaikos, but I am also a fan." In the new season, he has already scored 18 goals in 20 matches in the Greek League and one goal in the Greek Cup. He was also the team captain of Panathinaikos and the most valuable player of the club.

On 19 February 2011, Olympiacos beat Panathinaikos in Karaiskaki Stadium (2–1), after a controversial game. After the game, Cissé had a wrangle with Olympiacos' president Evangelos Marinakis, who also used homophobic slurs against Cissé. He was beaten by Olympiacos' fans and stated that he was going to appeal to the UEFA. He stated also that he had lost his patience with the questionable refereeing in Greece: "I will make my decisions but believe me, I've had enough. I can't go on under these conditions." One month later, Cissé reached 50 goals as a Panathinaikos player in domestic and European competitions. He celebrated this goal by wearing a t-shirt of Panathinaikos supporters group Gate 13.

=== Lazio ===
Cissé was transferred to Serie A club Lazio on 12 July 2011 for €5.8 million. He signed a four-year contract with the Italian side. He made his debut in a UEFA Europa League match against FK Rabotnički on 18 August, scoring two goals in a 6–0 win for the home side. Cissé scored his only league goal for Lazio on his league debut in a 2–2 draw with Milan at the San Siro on 9 September.

=== Queens Park Rangers ===
On 31 January 2012, Cissé signed a two-and-a-half-year deal with Queens Park Rangers for an undisclosed fee. He was Mark Hughes' fourth signing since taking over as manager. He scored on his debut, against Aston Villa in a 2–2 draw at Villa Park on 1 February. He was then given a straight red card in his second game for violent conduct, when he reacted to a late challenge by Wolverhampton Wanderers player Roger Johnson by grabbing Johnson by the throat. With QPR down to ten men, they went on to lose the game 2–1. On 21 March 2012, Cissé scored QPR's equalising goal in a 3–2 victory against his former club Liverpool.

Three days later, he was sent off for the second time in his first five games for QPR when he received a straight red card for a two-footed lunge on Sunderland's Fraizer Campbell. He then returned from suspension on 29 April 2012, and scored a late consolation goal against Chelsea in a 6–1 loss at Stamford Bridge. Cissé went on to score his fifth goal in seven matches to win the match against Stoke City. On 13 May 2012, Cissé scored the goal in the 48th minute to make it 1–1 against Manchester City. This was his sixth goal in eight matches for QPR. QPR went on to lose the match 2-3, as City scored two goals in stoppage time and clinched their first Premier League title, but avoided relegation as Bolton succumbed to a 2–2 draw at Stoke. Cissé picked the number nine for his jersey and scored his first goal in the 2012–13 season in a 3–2 loss against Reading in the League Cup and his first Premier League goal of the season, also against Reading on 4 November. In January 2013, he joined Qatari club Al Gharafa on loan until the end of the season. His loan ended on 30 June. He made nine league appearances and scored one goal in the championship and four in the AFC Champions League. Cissé left QPR by mutual consent on 28 June 2013.

=== Later career ===
On 3 July 2013, Cissé signed a one-year contract (plus one in option) with Kuban Krasnodar. On 1 January 2014, he signed an 18-month deal with Bastia. In June 2015, Cissé signed for Saint-Pierroise of the Réunion Premier League on a month-long contract, starting in September of the same year. On 20 October 2015, Cissé announced his retirement from football at the age of 34 due to injury. On 4 July 2017, Cissé returned to football after signing with Swiss side Yverdon. In August 2018, Cissé signed a contract with "A.C. Vicenza 1902", another phoenix club of Vicenza. However, after failing to enter Serie D, it was reported that the club started to owe wages to their players. Cissé announced his intention to come out of retirement in May 2020. He wanted to score four more goals in Ligue 1 to reach the mark of 100. In April 2021, Cissé joined American side Panathinaikos Chicago ahead of the 2021 National Premier Soccer League season.

In 2023, he joined Spanish seven-a-side team Los Troncos of the Kings League.

== International career ==
=== Youth career ===
Cissé played for the France under-19 team in the 2001 FIFA World Youth Championship, where they reached the quarter-finals, with the player scoring six goals in five games. These goals included a hat-trick against Iran on 18 June 2001 in a 5–0 win on their opening game, and two goals against Germany on 27 June 2001 in the round of 16.

He was included in the France under-21 team. in the 2004 UEFA European Under-21 Football Championship. Cissé scored two goals against Portugal in the first leg of qualification playoffs, winning 2–1. In the second leg, Cissé scored a goal but for kicking Mário Sérgio he was sent off. France went on to lose the game 4–1 on penalties, after drawing 3–3 on aggregate. As a result of the sending off, he was given a five match ban and missed UEFA Euro 2004.

=== Senior career ===
Cissé made his international debut against Belgium at the age of 21, coming on as a 48th-minute substitute for David Trezeguet on 18 May 2002. The team manager Roger Lemerre included Cissé in his 23-man squad for the 2002 FIFA World Cup. In the tournament, he played in all of the group matches against Senegal, Uruguay, and Denmark, coming on as a substitute in all three games, but France were eliminated in the World Cup group stages. His first goal in the senior tournament came on 7 September 2002 against Cyprus in the Euro 2004 qualifiers. Cissé was part of the 2003 FIFA Confederations Cup championship team. He scored his only goal of the tournament from the penalty spot in France's 1–0 win against Colombia on 18 June 2003.

After being banned from UEFA Euro 2004, Cissé was next in the 2006 FIFA World Cup tournament in Germany. In France's final warm-up match against China on 7 June 2006, he suffered another broken leg. When ten minutes into the game, he was knocked off balance by the China captain Zheng Zhi and fell with his leg twisting under him. "It's so tough to hear Djibril scream like that," said fellow French striker Thierry Henry. "You lose a teammate and also a friend. But he is tough; he will come back." He needed immediate surgery to repair his open fractured tibia so was out of the tournament. During the UEFA Euro 2008 qualifying campaign, Cissé played three games, but did not win a place in the France squad for the finals.

After demonstrating his goal-scoring form for Panathinaikos, in March 2010, Cissé was recalled to the French squad for a friendly against Spain in Paris. When introduced into the match as a substitute, he had a considerable impact, heading on a Florent Malouda cross only for Iker Casillas to push it onto the post. On 11 May 2010, he was included by manager Raymond Domenech in France's final 23-man squad for the 2010 FIFA World Cup in South Africa. On 22 June, he was in France's starting eleven for the team's final game of the group stage versus South Africa.

== Coaching career ==
In September 2021, Cissé took up a coaching position in the youth sector of former club Marseille.

== Personal life ==
=== Family ===
Cissé was born in France to Ivorian parents. He is also of Guinean descent. He was raised a Muslim and converted from Islam to Catholic Christianity at the age of 15 after taking catechism classes at a training center in Nîmes. His late father, Mangué, was a professional footballer and had captained his country, before his parents moved to France in 1974. Djibril was the seventh and last child of his family, after siblings N'ma, Damaye, Abou, Fode, Seni and Hamed. In 2005, after his move to Liverpool, Cissé purchased a manor house in the village of Frodsham, Cheshire, and in doing so became Lord of the manor of Frodsham. Soon after buying the house, his decision to refuse the Cheshire Forest Hunt permission to hunt on his land received substantial press coverage. On 18 June 2005, Cissé married former Welsh hairdresser Jude Littler. The wedding took place at Bodelwyddan Castle, with notable guests including Shaun Wright-Phillips and Cissé's French national teammates Louis Saha and Sylvain Wiltord. He got married in a tuxedo in the red of Liverpool.

The couple divorced in October 2014 and have three children, Cassius, Prince Kobe and Marley Jackson. Cissé has a daughter, Ilona, from a previous relationship. Prince Kobe is currently on the books of the Liverpool academy.

=== Health ===
Cissé is a teetotaler.

=== Other pursuits ===
Cissé had a cameo role in a French action comedy film Taxi 4, featuring in a high-speed driving scene.

Cissé has his own clothing range and fragrance, branded "Mr Lenoir".

In 2015, he participated in season 6 of Danse avec les stars, the French version of Dancing with the Stars with his partner Silvia Notargiacomo but got eliminated first, finishing in last place. In 2021, he took part in the second season of Mask Singer, disguised as a skeleton.

=== Legal issues ===
In January 2006, Cissé was cautioned in regards to assaulting his wife. In October 2015, Cissé was one of four people arrested in France over an alleged attempt to blackmail Mathieu Valbuena in a sex tape extortion plot. He was removed from the investigation in January 2021. On 13 November 2024, the Bastia court in Corsica sentenced him to a suspended eight-month prison sentence and a €20,000 fine for tax fraud.

== Career statistics ==
=== Club ===
Appearances and goals by club, season and competition
Club	Season	League			National cup (Note: Includes Coupe de France, FA Cup, Greek Football Cup, Coppa Italia)		League cup (Note: Includes Coupe de la Ligue, Football League Cup)		Continental		Other		Total	
Club	Season	Division	Apps	Goals	Apps	Goals	Apps	Goals	Apps	Goals	Apps	Goals	Apps	Goals
Auxerre	1998–99	French Division 1	1	0	0	0	0	0	—		—		1	0
Auxerre	1999–2000	French Division 1	2	0	0	0	1	0	—		—		3	0
Auxerre	2000–01	French Division 1	25	8	4	5	2	1	4	1	—		35	15
Auxerre	2001–02	French Division 1	29	22	0	0	2	2	—		—		31	24
Auxerre	2002–03	Ligue 1	33	14	6	6	0	0	6	1	—		45	21
Auxerre	2003–04	Ligue 1	38	26	3	1	4	1	7	2	1 (Note: Appearance in Trophée des Champions)	0	53	30
Auxerre	Total		128	70	13	12	9	4	17	4	1	0	168	90
Liverpool	2004–05	Premier League	16	4	0	0	0	0	9 (Note: Appearances in UEFA Champions League)	1	0	0	25	5
Liverpool	2005–06	Premier League	33	9	6	2	0	0	15	8	2 (Note: Appearance and 2 goals in UEFA Super Cup, one appearance in FIFA Club World Championship)	2	57	21
Liverpool	Total		49	13	6	2	0	0	24	9	2	0	82	26
Marseille (loan)	2006–07	Ligue 1	21	8	4	7	0	0	0	0	—		25	15
Marseille	2007–08	Ligue 1	35	16	3	2	2	1	10	3	—		50	22
Marseille	2008–09	Ligue 1	2	0	0	0	0	0	1	0	—		3	0
Marseille	Total		58	24	7	9	2	1	11	3	—		78	37
Sunderland (loan)	2008–09	Premier League	35	10	1	1	2	0	—		—		38	11
Panathinaikos	2009–10	Super League Greece	28	23	6	1	—		12 (Note: Appearances in UEFA Europa League)	5	—		46	29
Panathinaikos	2010–11	Super League Greece	33	24	4	2	—		6	0	—		43	26
Panathinaikos	Total		61	47	10	3	—		18	5	—		89	55
Lazio	2011–12	Serie A	18	1	2	1	—		7	3	—		27	5
Queens Park Rangers	2011–12	Premier League	8	6	—		—		—		—		8	6
Queens Park Rangers	2012–13	Premier League	18	3	1	0	2	1	—		—		21	4
Queens Park Rangers	Total		26	9	1	0	2	1	—		—		29	10
Al-Gharafa (loan)	2012–13	Qatar Stars League	9	1	0	0	0	0	8 (Note: Appearances in AFC Champions League)	4	—		17	5
Kuban Krasnodar	2013–14	Russian Premier League	15	4	0	0	—		10	1	—		25	5
Bastia	2013–14	Ligue 1	15	2	0	0	—		—		—		15	2
Bastia	2014–15	Ligue 1	8	0	1	1	3	3	—		—		12	4
Bastia	Total		23	2	1	1	3	3	—		—		27	6
Saint-Pierroise	2015	Réunion Premier League	1	0	0	0	—		—		—		1	0
Yverdon-Sport	2017–18	Swiss Promotion League	29	23	0	0	—		—		—		29	23
Career total			452	204	41	29	18	9	95	29	3	0	610	271

=== International ===
Appearances and goals by national team and year
National team	Year	Apps	Goals
France	2002	7	1
France	2003	9	2
France	2004	3	1
France	2005	8	5
France	2006	3	0
France	2007	5	0
France	2008	2	0
France	2009	0	0
France	2010	3	0
France	2011	1	0
Total		41	9

Scores and results list France's goal tally first, score column indicates score after each Cissé goal

List of international goals scored by Djibril Cissé
No.	Date	Venue	Opponent	Score	Result	Competition
1	7 September 2002	GSP Stadium, Nicosia, Cyprus	Cyprus	1–1	2–1	UEFA Euro 2004 qualifying
2	30 April 2003	Stade de France, Saint-Denis, France	Egypt	4–0	5–0	Friendly
3	22 June 2003	Stade de France, Saint-Denis, France	New Zealand	3–0	5–0	2003 FIFA Confederations Cup
4	8 September 2004	Tórsvøllur, Tórshavn, Faroe Islands	Faroe Islands	2–0	2–0	2006 FIFA World Cup qualification
5	31 May 2005	Stade Saint-Symphorien, Metz, France	Hungary	1–0	2–1	Friendly
6	3 September 2005	Stade Félix-Bollaert, Lens, France	Faroe Islands	1–0	3–0	2006 FIFA World Cup qualification
7	3 September 2005	Stade Félix-Bollaert, Lens, France	Faroe Islands	3–0	3–0	2006 FIFA World Cup qualification
8	8 October 2005	Stade de Suisse, Bern, Switzerland	Switzerland	1–0	1–1	2006 FIFA World Cup qualification
9	9 November 2005	Stade d'Honneur de Dillon, Fort-de-France, Martinique	Costa Rica	2–2	3–2	Friendly

== Honours ==
Auxerre

- Coupe de France: 2002–03

Liverpool

- FA Cup: 2005–06
- UEFA Champions League: 2004–05
- UEFA Super Cup: 2005
- FIFA Club World Championship runner-up: 2005

Panathinaikos

- Super League Greece: 2009–10
- Greek Football Cup: 2009–10

France

- FIFA Confederations Cup: 2003

Individual

- FIFA World Youth Championship Silver Shoe: 2001
- Ligue 1 top scorer: 2001–02
- UNFP Ligue 1 Player of the Month: December 2003
- UNFP Division 1 Young Player of the Year: 2001–02
- Super League Greece Best Foreign Player: 2010

== Media ==
For the 2022 FIFA World Cup, Djibril Cissé served as one of the consultants for France Télévisions' overseas division, alongside Wendie Renard and José Pierre-Fanfan. They provided expertise and analysis during matches and post-match discussions on the Réseau des 1ère channels, which broadcast 28 matches from the tournament in overseas France. On 3 January 2023, it was announced that Cissé had joined France Télévisions for its coverage of the Coupe de France.
