= Albert Budak =

French footballer (born 1985)

Personal information
- Date of birth: 27 January 1985 (age 41)
- Place of birth: Créteil, France
- Height: 1.83 m (6 ft 0 in)
- Position: Defender

Senior career*
Years	Team	Apps	(Gls)
2004–2005	Sedan	3	(0)
2005–2007	Laval (B team)		
2007–2008	La Vitréenne FC		
2008–2012	AFC Compiègne		
- * Club domestic league appearances and goals

Albert Budak (born 27 January 1985) is a French former professional footballer who played as a defender. He played on the professional level in Ligue 2 for Sedan and made an appearance in the 2005 Coupe de France final.

== Honours ==
Sedan

- Coupe de France runner-up: 2004–05
