= İsmail Budak =

German footballer

Personal information
- Date of birth: 8 July 1992 (age 34)
- Place of birth: Münster, Germany
- Height: 1.78 m (5 ft 10 in)
- Position: Forward

Team information
- Current team: Preußen Münster II
- Number: 20

Youth career
- –2010: Rot Weiss Ahlen
- 2010–2011: Arminia Bielefeld

Senior career*
Years	Team	Apps	(Gls)
2011–2012	VfL Osnabrück II	7	(4)
2011–2012	VfL Osnabrück	2	(0)
2013–2014	SC Verl	12	(0)
2015	Eintracht Rheine	8	(0)
2015–2016	SG Telgte 1919		
2016–	Preußen Münster II	48	(2)
- * Club domestic league appearances and goals as of 21:57, 24 April 2018 (UTC)

İsmail Budak (born 8 July 1992) is a German footballer who plays as a forward for Preußen Münster II.
