= Teemu Tainio =

Finnish footballer and manager (born 1979)

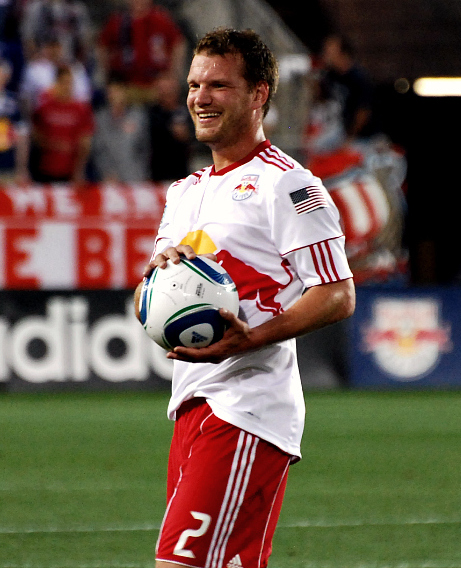
- Tainio playing for the New York Red Bulls in 2011

Personal information
- Full name: Teemu Mikael Tainio
- Date of birth: 27 November 1979 (age 46)
- Place of birth: Tornio, Finland
- Height: 1.76 m (5 ft 9 in)
- Position: Defensive midfielder

Youth career
- 1994–1995: TP-47

Senior career*
Years	Team	Apps	(Gls)
1996–1997	Haka	46	(14)
1997–2005	Auxerre	150	(14)
2005–2008	Tottenham Hotspur	61	(3)
2008–2010	Sunderland	21	(0)
2009–2010	→ Birmingham City (loan)	6	(0)
2010–2011	Ajax	2	(0)
2011–2012	New York Red Bulls	42	(0)
2013–2014	HJK	36	(3)
Total		364	(34)

International career
1998–2014	Finland	64	(6)

Managerial career
- 2017: Klubi 04 (assistant)
- 2018: Haka (assistant)
- 2019–2023: Haka
- 2023–2024: AEL Limassol (assistant)
- 2024: Tallinna Kalev (assistant)
- 2024: Finland (assistant)
- 2024–2025: Tallinna Kalev
- * Club domestic league appearances and goals

Teemu Mikael Tainio (born 27 November 1979) is a Finnish football coach and former player.

Tainio began his career with his local club, TP-47, before moving to FC Haka in 1996. A year later, he moved to France to play for Auxerre. After eight years there, he joined English club Tottenham Hotspur, where he spent three years before joining Sunderland. After a loan spell with Birmingham City during the 2009–10 season, he moved to Dutch club Ajax, before joining the New York Red Bulls in 2011. After two seasons in the United States, he returned to Finland to finish his career with HJK.

He mostly played in a variety of midfield positions during his career, and also at right-back under Juande Ramos at Tottenham.

== Club career ==
=== Early life and career ===
Tainio was born in Tornio. He was promoted to the first team of his hometown club TP-47 in Kakkonen, Finland's third tier, at the age of fourteen. He was signed by Veikkausliiga club FC Haka for the 1996 season.

=== Auxerre ===
Following a trial at Manchester United in March 1997, Tainio was bought by French top-tier club AJ Auxerre in 1997 for a fee equivalent of €760,000 in current currency, and spent eight years at the club. He won the Coupe de France with Auxerre twice, and also gained UEFA Champions League experience. While with Auxerre, Tainio appeared in 204 official matches and scored 19 goals.

=== Tottenham Hotspur ===
With Tainio's contract with Auxerre due to expire in 2005, he became available on a free transfer. In January 2005, it was announced that he would move to Tottenham Hotspur on a seven-year deal in the summer of 2005. He became a regular for Spurs in his first season, playing in various midfield positions.

He scored his first goal for his new club in December 2005 against Newcastle United during a Premiership match at White Hart Lane. Tainio was one of ten Spurs squad members struck down by a virus on the evening of 6 May 2006 before their crucial final game of the season against West Ham. He nevertheless played in the match, which Spurs lost, missing out on a place in the Champions League.

He scored his second Spurs goal on 9 December 2006, the third goal in the 5–1 home win against Charlton Athletic. His third goal for the club was an equaliser against West Ham United to make the score 2–2 on 4 March 2007. Spurs went on to win the game 4–3.

Tainio won the 2008 League Cup when Tottenham took a 2–1 extra-time win over Chelsea at Wembley Stadium in the final played on 24 February 2008. He came on as a substitute in the 75th minute when the score was 1–1. He then was booked with five more minutes left in the game for time wasting on a throw in.

=== Sunderland ===
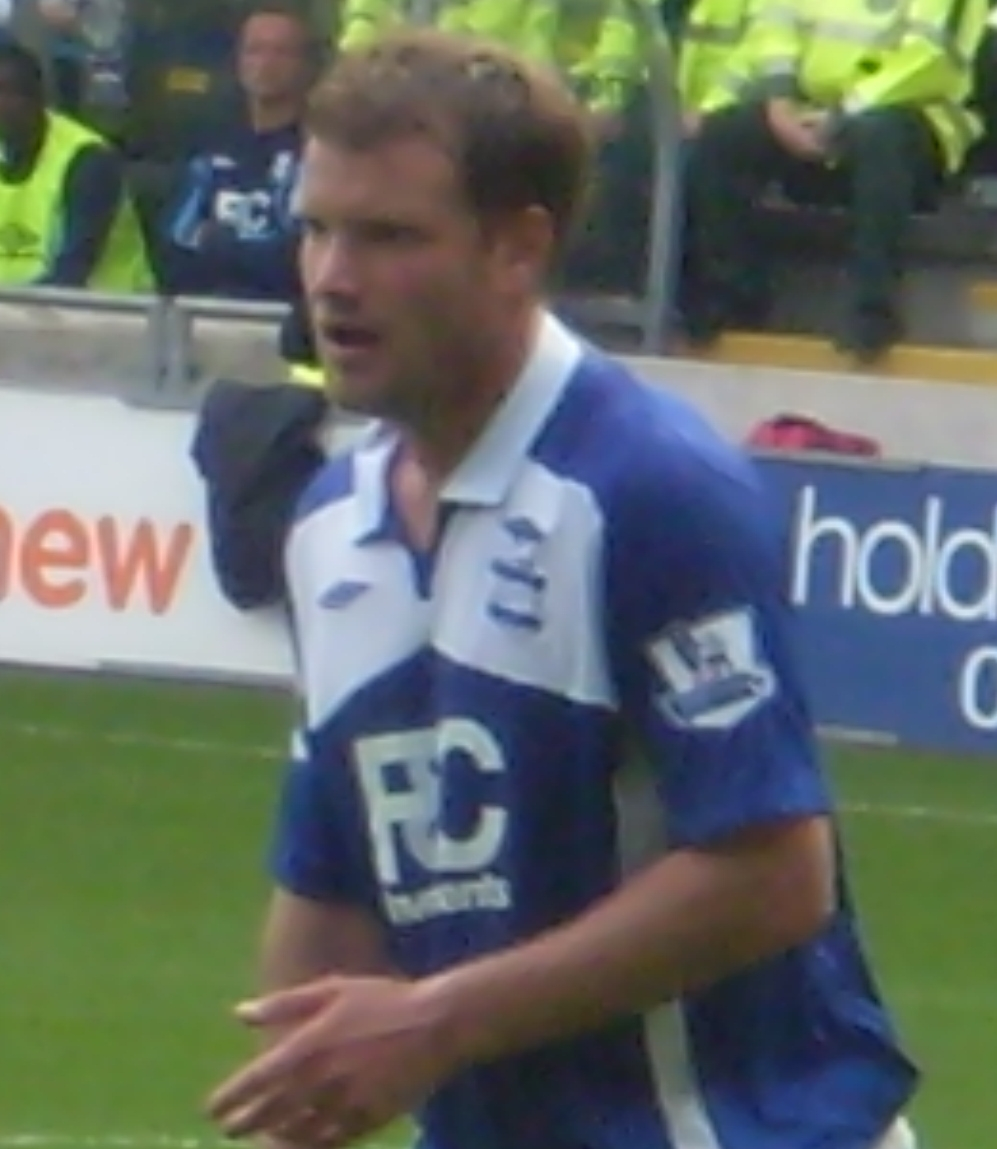
Tainio playing for Birmingham City in 2009

He joined Sunderland on 23 July 2008 for an undisclosed fee, reported to be €3 million. He became their first summer signing and the first Finnish player ever for Sunderland. He scored his first goal for Sunderland in a second round League Cup game at Norwich on 24 August 2009. He left Sunderland on 31 August 2010, when the club terminated his contract by mutual consent.

Tainio joined Birmingham City on 1 September 2009, on loan for the remainder of the 2009–10 season. Having recovered from a calf injury sustained on international duty, he made his debut for the club on 13 September in a 1–0 home defeat in the Birmingham derby against Aston Villa, in which he produced a good performance in a less-familiar role at right-back.

=== Ajax ===
Tainio signed a one-year contract with AFC Ajax on the very same day after he was released by Sunderland. At Ajax, he rejoined his former Tottenham coach, Martin Jol. He made his Ajax debut on 11 September 2010, playing the last five minutes as a substitute for Demy de Zeeuw in a 2–0 victory over Willem II. He also made appearance in the 2010–11 Champions League, playing the last 21 minutes against Real Madrid in the 2–0 away loss match in the group stage. After making only five official appearances while with Ajax, Tainio accepted an offer from Major League Soccer side New York Red Bulls.

=== New York Red Bulls ===
Tainio joined New York Red Bulls during their pre-season training for the 2011 Major League Soccer season. He became the first Finn to sign for the team formerly known as the New York/New Jersey Metrostars when the club officially signed him on 9 March 2011. He made his official debut for New York on 19 March 2011, in the Red Bulls' 2011 MLS season opener, a 1–0 victory over Seattle Sounders FC, assisting on Juan Agudelo's game-winning goal. He has quickly become a fan favorite early in the season with multiple assists and good play to his name. On 15 November 2012, Tainio, along with teammates Jan Gunnar Solli, Bill Gaudette, and José Angulo were all denied contract extensions, thus ending their tenure at New York.

=== HJK Helsinki ===
On 2 January 2013, it was announced that the 33-year-old Tainio had signed a two-year contract with the reigning Finnish champions, HJK Helsinki. On 19 June 2013, he scored his first goal for HJK, in a 4−2 away win over MYPA. This was his first goal since 24 August 2009. On 14 February 2015, Tainio announced his retirement as a player.

== International career ==
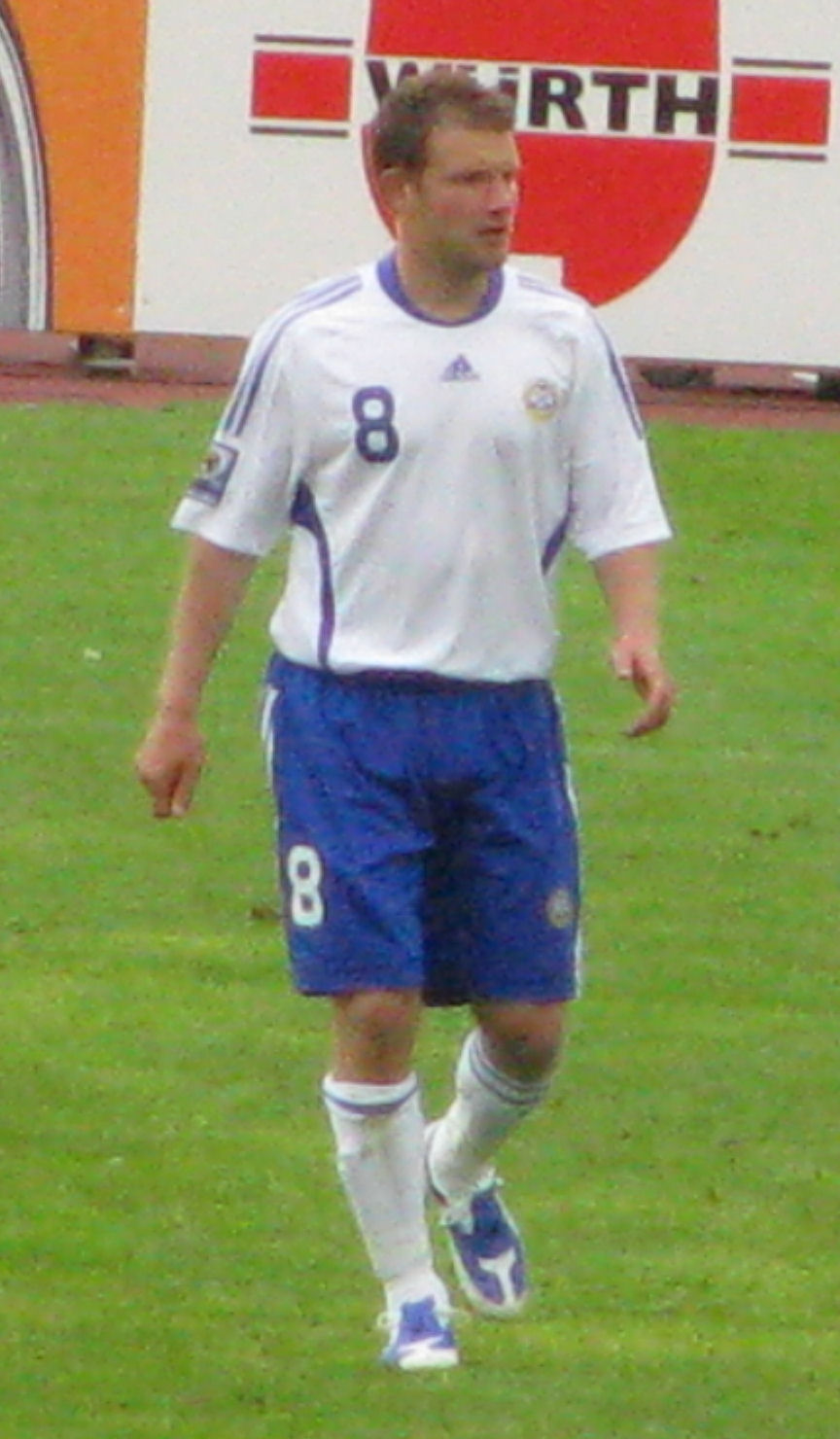
Tainio playing for Finland in 2009

Tainio made his debut for the Finland national team on 5 February 1998 against Cyprus, and was a regular for the team through most of the 2000s. After signing with New York Red Bulls in 2011, Tainio announced that he might retire at the international level, citing the long-distance flights and time difference between the States and Finland. After a two-year hiatus, Tainio made his comeback to the international team, immediately after his contract with the Red Bulls expired.

== Managerial career ==
After Tainio ended his playing career, he worked for his former club Tottenham as a scout, before returning to Finland and starting as an assistant coach of Klubi 04, the reserve team of HJK Helsinki.

=== Haka ===
On 1 November 2018, Tainio was appointed as manager of Ykkönen side FC Haka, having previously worked as an assistant coach for the side. In his first season as manager, FC Haka overwhelmingly won the Ykkönen title, earning the club promotion to top tier Veikkausliiga.

In the 2022 Veikkausliiga season, Tainio led Haka to finish 4th in the league with a limited budget and gained place in the 2023–24 UEFA Europa Conference League qualifiers, club's first appearance in Europe since 2008–09 UEFA Cup.

==== AEL Limassol (assistant) ====
On 28 October 2023, it was reported that Tainio starts working as the assistant coach of AEL Limassol in Cypriot First Division. On 22 January 2024, the club announced the termination of the contract of head coach Toni Koskela by mutual agreement, and simultaneously Tainio's contract was terminated as well.

=== Tallinna Kalev ===
On 7 March 2024, Tainio was named the assistant coach of Tallinna Kalev in Estonian Meistriliiga. On 1 August 2024, he was named the manager of the club.

==== Finland (assistant) ====
On 17 June 2024, Tainio was also named an assistant coach of the Finland national football team. His tenure ended in February 2025, when Jacob Friis replaced Markku Kanerva as head coach.

== Personal life ==
His son Maximus Tainio is a Finnish professional footballer for USL League One club Sarasota Paradise.

== Career statistics ==
=== Club ===
Appearances and goals by club, season and competition
Club	Season	League			National cup (Note: Includes Coupe de France, FA Cup, KNVB Cup, Finnish Cup)		League cup (Note: Includes Coupe de la Ligue, Football League Cup, Finnish League Cup)		Continental		Other		Total	
Club	Season	Division	Apps	Goals	Apps	Goals	Apps	Goals	Apps	Goals	Apps	Goals	Apps	Goals
Haka	1996	Veikkausliiga	20	4	0	0	–		4 (Note: Appearances in UEFA Cup)	0	–		24	4
Haka	1997	Ykkönen	26	10	0	0	–		–		–		26	10
Haka	Total		46	14	0	0	0	0	4	0	0	0	50	14
Auxerre	1997–98	Division 1	1	0	0	0	0	0	—		–		1	0
Auxerre	1998–99	Division 1	13	1	0	0	0	0	—		–		13	1
Auxerre	1999–00	Division 1	25	3	1	0	1	0	—		–		27	3
Auxerre	2000–01	Division 1	10	1	0	0	1	0	5 (Note: Appearances in UEFA Intertoto Cup)	0	–		16	1
Auxerre	2001–02	Division 1	28	3	1	0	2	0	—		–		31	3
Auxerre	2002–03	Ligue 1	25	1	3	0	0	0	11 (Note: Seven appearances in UEFA Champions League, four appearances and one goal in UEFA Cup)	1	–		39	2
Auxerre	2003–04	Ligue 1	22	3	3	1	4	0	7	1	1 (Note: Appearance in Trophée des Champions)	0	37	5
Auxerre	2004–05	Ligue 1	26	2	4	1	3	0	7	0	–		40	3
Auxerre	Total		150	14	12	2	11	0	30	2	1	0	204	18
Auxerre B	1997–98	CFA	5	1	–		–		–		–		5	1
Auxerre B	1998–99	CFA	14	3	–		–		–		–		14	3
Auxerre B	Total		19	4	0	0	0	0	0	0	0	0	19	4
Tottenham Hotspur	2005–06	Premier League	24	1	1	0	0	0	—		—		25	1
Tottenham Hotspur	2006–07	Premier League	21	2	4	0	1	0	6	0	—		32	2
Tottenham Hotspur	2007–08	Premier League	16	0	2	0	5	0	3	0	—		26	0
Tottenham Hotspur	Total		61	3	7	0	6	0	9	0	0	0	83	3
Sunderland	2008–09	Premier League	21	0	1	0	0	0	—		—		22	0
Sunderland	2009–10	Premier League	0	0	0	0	1	1	—		—		1	1
Sunderland	Total		21	0	1	0	1	1	0	0	0	0	23	1
Birmingham City (loan)	2009–10	Premier League	6	0	0	0	0	0	—		—		6	0
Ajax	2010–11	Eredivisie	2	0	1	0	—		2 (Note: Appearance(s) in UEFA Champions League)	0	—		5	0
New York Red Bulls	2011	MLS	28	0	0	0	—		—		3 (Note: Appearances in MLS Cup Playoffs)	0	31	0
New York Red Bulls	2012	MLS	14	0	0	0	—		—		2	0	16	0
New York Red Bulls	Total		42	0	0	0	0	0	0	0	5	0	47	0
HJK	2013	Veikkausliiga	20	2	2	0	3	0	1	0	—		26	2
HJK	2014	Veikkausliiga	16	1	3	0	1	0	9 (Note: Four appearances in UEFA Champions League, five appearances in UEFA Europa League)	0	—		29	1
HJK	Total		36	3	5	0	4	0	10	0	0	0	55	3
Career total			383	39	26	2	22	1	55	2	6	0	492	44

=== International ===
Appearances and goals by national team and year
National team	Year	Apps	Goals
Finland	1998	3	0
Finland	1999	1	0
Finland	2000	3	0
Finland	2001	4	1
Finland	2002	6	0
Finland	2003	6	3
Finland	2004	2	1
Finland	2005	8	0
Finland	2006	2	0
Finland	2007	6	1
Finland	2008	5	0
Finland	2009	4	0
Finland	2010	2	0
Finland	2011	0	0
Finland	2012	0	0
Finland	2013	9	0
Finland	2014	3	0
Total		64	6

Scores and results list Finland's goal tally first, score column indicates score after each Tainio goal.

List of international goals scored by Teemu Tainio
No.	Date	Venue	Opponent	Score	Result	Competition
1	1 September 2001	Tirana, Albania	Albania		2–0	2002 FIFA World Cup qualification
2	6 September 2003	Baku, Azerbaijan	Azerbaijan		2–1	UEFA Euro 2004 qualifying
3	11 October 2003	Tampere, Finland	Canada		3–2	Friendly
4	16 November 2003	Houston, United States	Honduras		2–1	Friendly
5	13 October 2004	Amsterdam, Netherlands	Netherlands		1–3	2006 FIFA World Cup qualification
6	22 August 2007	Tampere, Finland	Kazakhstan		2–1	UEFA Euro 2008 qualifying

== Managerial statistics ==
As of 30 April 2025

Team	Nat	From	To	Record				
Team	Nat	From	To	P	W	D	L	W%
Haka	(Finland)	1 January 2019	31 October 2023	165	75	38	52	45.5
Tallinna Kalev	(Estonia)	1 August 2024	24 April 2025	29	8	4	17	27.6
Total				194	83	42	69	42.8

== Honours ==
=== Player ===
FC Haka

- Finnish Cup: 1997

Auxerre

- Coupe de France: 2002–03, 2004–05
- Trophée des Champions runner-up: 2003

Tottenham Hotspur

- Football League Cup: 2007–08

Ajax

- Eredivisie: 2010–11

HJK

- Veikkausliiga: 2013, 2014
- Finnish Cup: 2014

=== Manager ===
FC Haka

- Ykkönen: 2019
