= Hélder Esteves =

Portuguese football manager and former player

Personal information
- Full name: Hélder Vale de Padros Esteves
- Date of birth: 1 July 1977 (age 49)
- Place of birth: Bragança, Portugal
- Height: 1.74 m (5 ft 9 in)
- Position: Striker

Senior career*
Years	Team	Apps	(Gls)
2000–2001	Lusitanos Saint-Maur	38	(40)
2001–2003	Auxerre	2	(0)
2003	Créteil	13	(3)
2003–2004	Troyes	21	(9)
2004–2009	Dijon	86	(14)
2009–2012	Créteil	59	(11)
2012–2014	Lusitanos Saint-Maur		
2014–2016	Annecy		

Managerial career
- 2014–2016: Annecy FC (player-assistant)
- 2016–2019: Annecy FC
- 2020–2021: Thonon Évian F.C.
- * Club domestic league appearances and goals

Hélder Esteves (born 1 July 1977) is a Portuguese former football striker and current manager.

== Coaching career ==
After retiring in the summer 2016, Esteves became manager of Annecy FC, after having played as a playing assistant manager for the last two years. In May 2019, it was announced that Esteves had decided to resign. Esteves was manager of Thonon Évian F.C. in Championnat National 3 from October 2020 until May 2021.
