= David Recorbet =

French footballer (born 1976)

Personal information
- Date of birth: October 24, 1976 (age 50)
- Place of birth: Clermont-Ferrand, France
- Height: 1.87 m (6 ft 2 in)
- Position: Defender

Youth career
- 1988–1990: US Laon
- 1990–1992: INF Clairefontaine
- 1992–1997: Auxerre

Senior career*
Years	Team	Apps	(Gls)
1995–2005	Auxerre	10	(0)
2000–2001	→ ES Wasquehal (loan)	25	(0)
2005–2007	Lorient	21	(1)
Total		56	(1)
- * Club domestic league appearances and goals

David Recorbet (born October 24, 1976) is a French former professional footballer who played as a defender.
