= Fabien Cool =

French footballer (born 1972)

Personal information
- Date of birth: 29 August 1972 (age 54)
- Place of birth: L'Isle-Adam, France
- Height: 1.86 m (6 ft 1 in)
- Position: Goalkeeper

Senior career*
| Years | Team | Apps | (Gls) |
| 1992–2007 | Auxerre | 467 | (0) |
| 1993–1994 | → Gueugnon (loan) | 2 | (0) |
| Total | | 469 | (0) |
- * Club domestic league appearances and goals

Fabien Cool (born 29 August 1972) is a French former professional footballer who played as a goalkeeper.

Except for a loan spell at Gueugnon in the 1993–94 season, Cool played for Auxerre his whole career, helping them to win the national championship in 1996 and the domestic cup in 1996, 2003 and 2005.

Initially backing up French international Lionel Charbonnier, he was the club's undisputed starter from 1998 to 2006, losing that status in his final year. Cool announced his retirement from professional football on 19 May 2007.

After retiring, he became involved in tennis administration, being elected president of the Bourgogne-Franche-Comté tennis league in 2023.

== Honours ==
Auxerre

- Division 1: 1995-96
- Coupe de France: 2003, 2005
