= Frédéric Jay =

French footballer (born 1976)

Personal information
- Date of birth: 20 September 1976 (age 50)
- Place of birth: Mâcon, France
- Height: 1.74 m (5 ft 9 in)
- Position: Right-back

Team information
- Current team: Louhans-Cuiseaux (manager)

Youth career
- 1994–1996: Auxerre

Senior career*
Years	Team	Apps	(Gls)
1996–2003	Auxerre	91	(0)
2003	→ Rennes (loan)	12	(0)
2003–2005	Grenoble	67	(0)
2006–2010	Mons	104	(2)
Total		264	(2)

Managerial career
- 2015–2017: Mâcon
- 2018–: Louhans-Cuiseaux
- * Club domestic league appearances and goals

Frédéric Jay (born 20 September 1976) is a French professional football manager and former player. He is the head coach of Championnat National 1 club Louhans-Cuiseaux.

== Managerial career ==
Jay was the manager of Mâcon from 2015 to 2017. In 2018, he became the manager of Louhans-Cuiseaux.
