= Kuami Agboh =

Togolese footballer (born 1977)

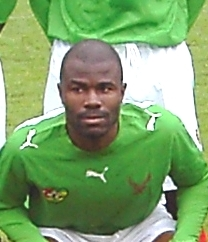
- Agboh with Togo in May 2006

Personal information
- Full name: Kuami Agboh
- Date of birth: 28 December 1977 (age 48)
- Place of birth: Tsévié, Togo
- Height: 1.77 m (5 ft 10 in)
- Position: Defensive midfielder

Senior career*
Years	Team	Apps	(Gls)
1997–2003	Auxerre B	39	(1)
1998–2003	Auxerre	76	(0)
2003–2004	Grenoble	28	(1)
2005–2006	Auxerre B	7	(1)
2006	Beveren	9	(1)
2007–2008	MyPa	25	(0)
Total		184	(4)

International career
- France U18
- France U21
2005–2008	Togo	5	(0)
- * Club domestic league appearances and goals

Kuami Agboh (born 28 December 1977) is a Togolese former professional footballer who played as a defensive midfielder. Born in Tsévié, Togo, he developed at the youth academy of French club Auxerre. After representing France at youth international level, he switched to the Togo national team and participated in the 2006 FIFA World Cup.

== Club career ==
Born in Tsévié, Togo, Agboh is a product of the Auxerre youth academy. He made his first-team debut for Auxerre during the 1997–98 season and went on to make 76 league appearances for the club through the 2002–03 season. In the summer of 2003, he moved to Grenoble, where he spent the 2003–04 season.

After leaving Grenoble in the summer of 2004, Agboh had a trial with Ligue 2 club Brest in November of that year. In 2004, he also had a trial with Norwegian club Viking. In February 2005, he had a trial with Allsvenskan club Assyriska FF.

Agboh subsequently returned to Auxerre, where he played for the reserve team. During the 2005–06 season, he made seven league appearances and scored one goal for Auxerre B. In January 2006, he signed a six-month contract with Belgian club Beveren. He made nine league appearances and scored one goal for the club.

In January 2007, Agboh left Beveren and joined Finnish club MyPa, signing a two-year contract. He played in Finland for two seasons, in 2007 and 2008, making 25 league appearances.

After ending his professional playing career, Agboh returned to France and played for amateur club Stade Auxerrois. In July 2013, he joined ES Appoigny, a club competing in the lower tiers of French football, and continued his playing career there.

== International career ==
Agboh represented France at youth international level. In 1996, he participated in the UEFA European Under-18 Championship with the France under-18 team, winning the tournament. The following year, he won the Toulon Tournament with the France under-20 team and also participated in the 1997 FIFA World Youth Championship.

On 11 November 2005, he made his debut for the Togo national team in a friendly match against Paraguay, which Togo lost 4–2. Agboh was subsequently included in Togo's squad for the 2006 FIFA World Cup, held in Germany.

On 19 June 2006, Agboh started in the group-stage match against the Switzerland national team, playing for approximately 24 minutes in a 2–0 defeat. He did not feature in Togo's opening match against South Korea or their final group-stage match against France.

== Post-playing career ==
From 2009 to 2013, Agboh worked as a coach at former club AJ Auxerre.

In July 2013, he joined lower-league club Appoigny.
