= Johan Radet =

French footballer (born 1976)

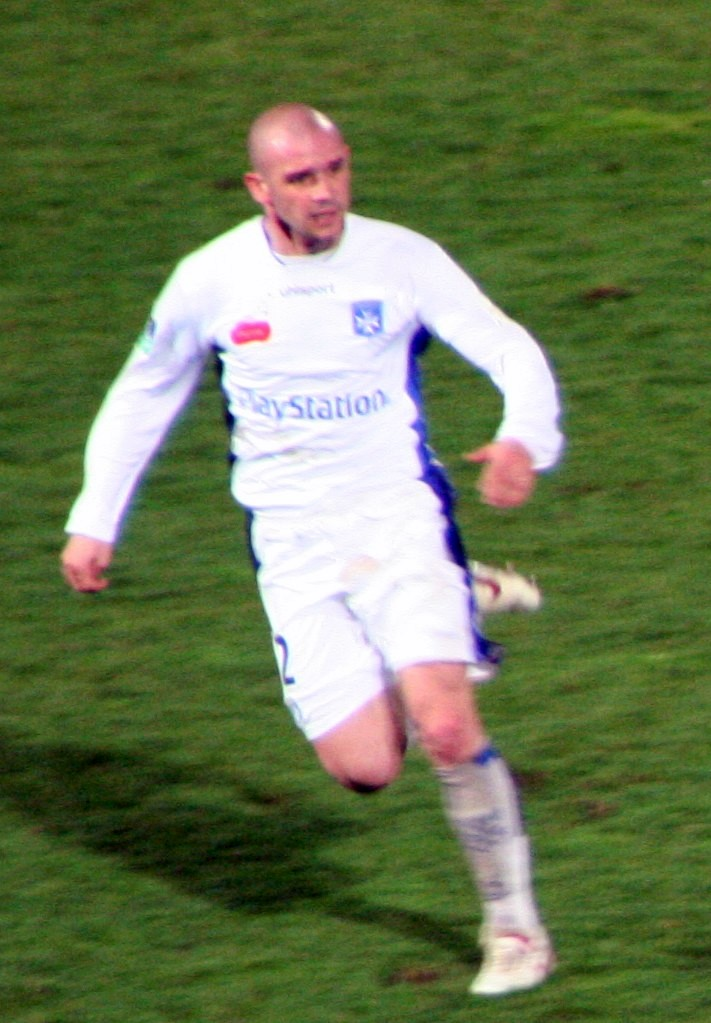
- Radet with Auxerre in 2006

Personal information
- Date of birth: 24 November 1976 (age 49)
- Place of birth: La Fère, France
- Height: 1.75 m (5 ft 9 in)
- Position: Defender

Senior career*
Years	Team	Apps	(Gls)
1996–2007	Auxerre	191	(0)
- * Club domestic league appearances and goals

Johan Radet (born 24 November 1976) is a French former professional footballer who played as defender. Whilst at Auxerre he helped them win the Coupe de France in both 2003 and 2005, playing in both finals.

In 2007, he was close to be recruited by RC Strasbourg, but the doctor detected a heart anomaly, similar the one Marc-Vivien Foé had. This ultimately forced Radet to retire.
