= Guy Roux =

French football player and manager (born 1938)

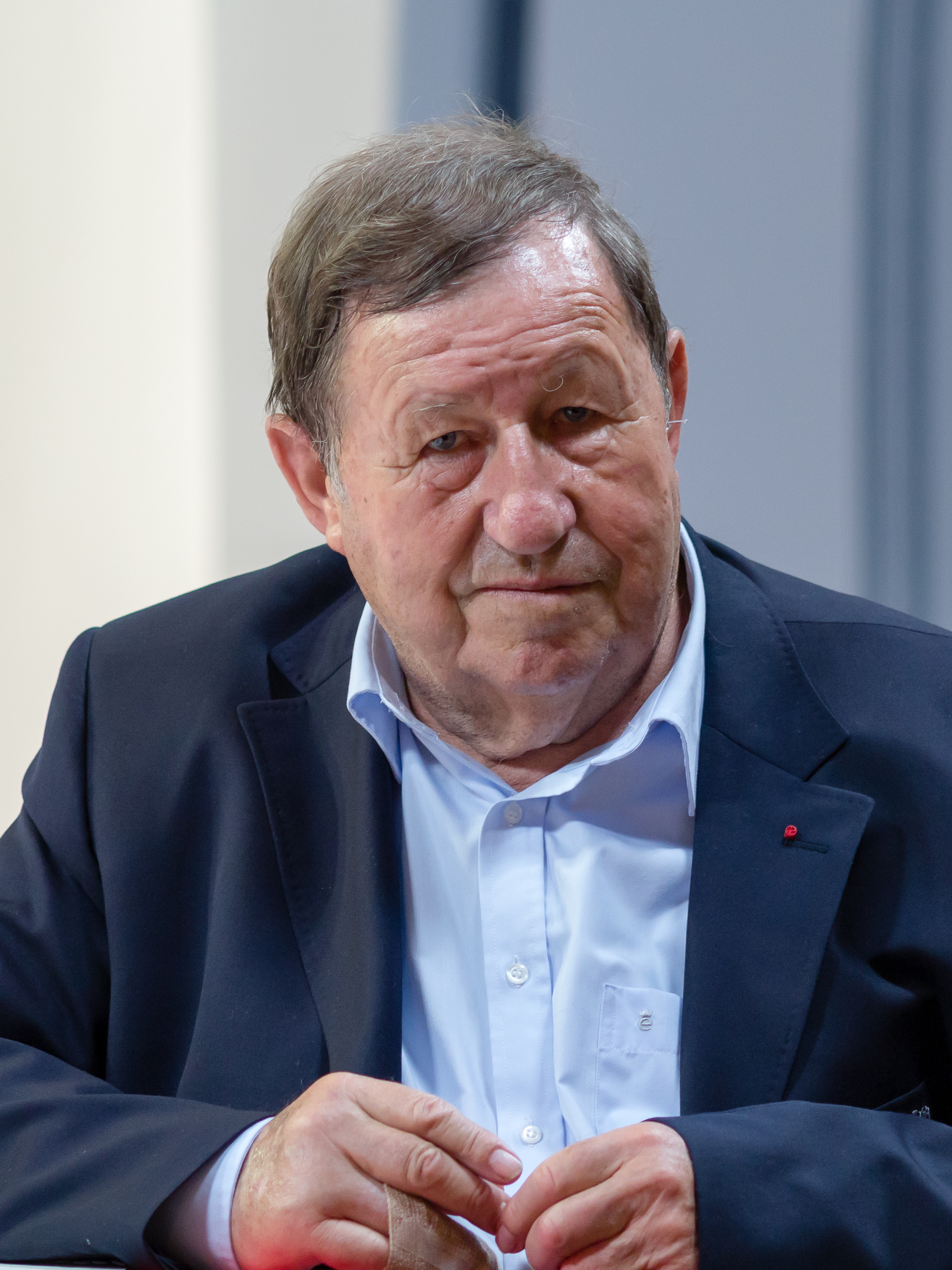
- Roux in 2014

Personal information
- Full name: Guy Marcel Roux
- Date of birth: 18 October 1938 (age 88)
- Place of birth: Colmar, France
- Height: 1.76 m (5 ft 9 in)
- Position: Midfielder

Senior career*
| Years | Team | Apps | (Gls) |
| 1954–1957 | Auxerre | | |
| 1957–1958 | Stade Poitevin | | |
| 1958–1961 | Limoges | | |
| 1961–1962 | Auxerre | | |

Managerial career
- 1961–1962: Auxerre
- 1964–2000: Auxerre
- 2001–2005: Auxerre
- 2007: Lens
- * Club domestic league appearances and goals

Guy Marcel Roux (French pronunciation: [ɡi ʁu]; born 18 October 1938) is a French former football player and manager known for being in charge of Auxerre for more than 40 years and for leading the team to national and worldwide prominence.

== Managerial career ==
A native of Colmar, Guy was the son of Marcel Roux, a young Aspirant officer from the military school of Saint-Maixent, transferred to the 152nd infantry regiment (known as the "red devils of 15/2"), and Alice Lorry, daughter of a former market gardener who became a merchant supplier of vegetables to the Army. He played for Auxerre between 1954 and 1957 and became player-manager of the then Division d'Honneur (fourth level) club in 1961 to become its living legend and symbol. In 1970, Auxerre got promoted to the Division 3 League, and Roux retired as a player. In 1974, Auxerre got promoted again, this time to Division 2. With Roux in charge, the team made it to a Coupe de France final in 1979 and progressed to Division 1 in 1980. The team then went further to clinch the Division 1 title in 1995–96 and win the Coupe de France four times (1993–94, 1995–96, 2002–03, 2004–05). Among Auxerre's honours under Roux are also an Intertoto Cup triumph and the 1992–93 UEFA Cup semi-final. Roux retired in 2000, but returned the next year.

Guy Roux was a prominent member of the union of professional coaches called UNECATEF; in particular, he was its secretary general from 1977 to 2000.. Thus was born a strong friendship between Roux and Michel Hidalgo, who had previously had an important role at the UNFP, that is to say for the benefit of professional players.

Roux has always had a great admiration for Alf Ramsey, coach of the famous England team at the World Cup in 1966. Guy Roux, like Georges Boulogne and Michel Hidalgo, believed that a strong infrastructure was paramount to long-term success. The inauguration of the AJA training center in 1982 was a great moment in his life as a coach. In 1980, Roux rejected the chance to sign French international striker Olivier Rouyer in favour of opening this state-of-the-art youth academy. During his period at the helm, the team established itself as a powerhouse in French football and became known worldwide as an academy for top players, since it was the club where football stars such as Eric Cantona, Basile Boli, Alain Goma, Frédéric Darras, Pascal Vahirua, Raphael Guerreiro, Stéphane Mazzolini, Djibril Cissé, Philippe Mexès and Teemu Tainio won themselves a name by being spotted and their talent further developed by Roux. He also helped rebuild the careers of players such as Laurent Blanc and Enzo Scifo, after they had experienced poor spells.

In 2000, Roux was a recipient of the UEFA President's Award which recognises outstanding achievements, professional excellence and exemplary personal qualities.

Roux retired from managing Auxerre in June 2005 to be replaced by Jacques Santini. At the end of his career as Auxerre manager, Roux led the team through about 2,000 games, including a European record of 890 top-flight league matches.

He briefly came out of retirement in June 2007 when he signed a two-year contract with Lens. However, he resigned on 25 August 2007 during a 2–1 defeat at Strasbourg after only four matches without a win at the helm.

== Managerial statistics ==
As of 26 August 2007

Managerial record by team and tenure
| Team | From | To | Record | | | | |
| Team | From | To | G | W | D | L | Win % |
|---|---|---|---|---|---|---|---|
| Auxerre | 1 July 1961 | 30 June 2005 | 1,747 | 816 | 420 | 511 | 46.71 |
| Lens | 1 July 2007 | 26 August 2007 | 7 | 1 | 4 | 2 | 14.29 |
| Career total | | | 1,754 | 817 | 424 | 513 | 46.58 |

== Honours ==
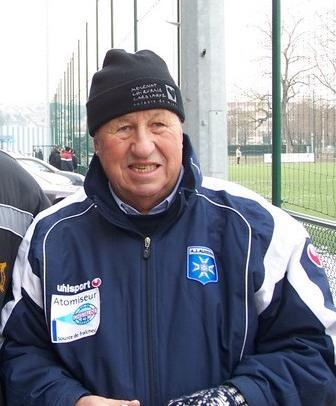
Roux with AJ Auxerre in 2003

=== Manager ===
Auxerre

- Division 1: 1995–96
- Coupe de France: 1993–94, 1995–96, 2002–03, 2004–05
- Division 2: 1979–80
- Division d'Honneur de Bourgogne: 1969–70
- UEFA Intertoto Cup: 1997
- Coppa delle Alpi: 1985, 1987

Individual

- Ligue 1 Manager of the Year: 1995–96
- UEFA President's Award: 2000

Orders

- Knight of the Legion of Honour: 1999
- Officer of the Legion of Honour: 2008

== See also ==
- List of longest managerial reigns in association football
- List of football managers with the most matches

== Bibliography ==
- (fr) Guy Roux (with Dominique Grimault), Entre nous, Mémoires, Plon, May 2006, 398 pages. ISBN 2-259-20391-4 or EAN 978-2-259-20391-3. (said "between us" or confession about a life dedicated to soccer)
- (fr) Guy Roux (with Denis Chaumier), Il n'y a pas que le foot dans la vie, Mémoires, Archipoche, February 2015, 375 pages. EAN 978-2352877158. (Memories of Guy Roux outside of soccer)
- (fr) Guy Roux (with Alexandre Alain), Confidences, Talent sport, March 2023, 250 pages, Preface of Djibril Cissé. EAN 9782378153014
