= Jean-Claude Hamel =

French association football club president (1929–2020)

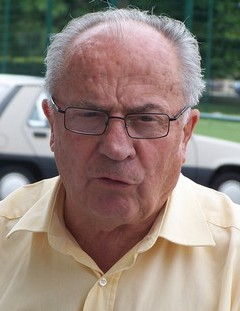
Jean-Claude Hamel

Jean-Claude André Adolphe Hamel (9 July 1929 – 2 June 2020) was the President of AJ Auxerre from 1963 to 2009, when he was replaced by Alain Dujon.

== Honours ==
Orders

- Knight of the Legion of Honour: 2002
