= 2002–03 Coupe de France =

Tournament details
- Country: France
- Teams: 5,850

Final positions
- Champions: Auxerre
- Runners-up: Paris Saint-Germain

Tournament statistics
- Top goal scorer(s): Djibril Cissé (6 goals)

The Coupe de France 2002–03 was its 86th edition. It was won by AJ Auxerre.

The cup winner qualified for UEFA Cup.

== Round of 64 ==
Team 1	Score	Team 2
Marseille (L1)	2–0	Bastia (L1)
Grenoble (L2)	2–1	Sochaux (L1)
Nice (L1)	0–0 (a.e.t.) (2–4 p)	Metz (L2)
Caen (L2)	1–2	Auxerre (L1)
Amiens (L2)	5–3 (a.e.t.)	Montpellier (L1)
Reims (L2)	0–2	Nantes (L1)
Wasquehal (L2)	3–2 (a.e.t.)	Monaco (L1)
Sète (Nat.)	1–4	Rennes (L1)
Valenciennes (Nat.)	2–3	Le Havre (L1)
Besançon (Nat.)	0–1 (a.e.t.)	Paris Saint-Germain (L1)
Martigues (Nat.)	0–0 (a.e.t.) (3–1 p)	Sedan (L1)
Bourg-Péronnas (CFA)	1–0	Strasbourg (L1)
Forbach (CFA)	2–3	Lens (L1)
Libourne-Saint-Seurin (CFA)	1–0	Lyon (L1)
Vitré (CFA)	1–3	Ajaccio (L1)
Schiltigheim (CFA2)	3–1	Troyes (L1)
Armentières (CFA2)	0–3	Bordeaux (L1)
Quimper (DH)	0–3	Lille (L1)
Genêts Anglet (DH)	0–1	Guingamp (L1)
Nancy (L2)	1–0	Niort (L2)
Toulouse (L2)	3–1	Viry-Châtillon (Nat.)
Vitrolles (CFA2)	1–1 (a.e.t.) (3–5 p)	Laval (L2)
Montélimar (CFA2)	0–3	Lorient (L2)
Changé (CFA2)	0–4	Beauvais (L2)
Carquefou (CFA2)	1–4 (a.e.t.)	Le Mans (L2)
Tours (CFA)	0–0 (a.e.t.) (2–4 p)	Angoulême (Nat.)
La Vitréenne (CFA2)	1–2	Dijon (Nat.)
Seyssinet Pariset (DH)	1–0	Nîmes (Nat.)
Amnéville (CFA2)	2–1	Raon (Nat.)
Quevilly (CFA)	6–1	La Rochelle (CFA2)
Villeurbanne (District)	0–3	Agde (CFA)
Maubeuge (DH)	1–2	ES Lambres (PH)

== Round of 32 ==
Team 1	Score	Team 2
Paris Saint-Germain (L1)	2–1	Marseille (L1)
Nancy (L2)	0–1	Metz (L2)
Amnéville (CFA2)	0–3	Auxerre (L1)
Schiltigheim (CFA2)	1–0	Beauvais (L2)
Seyssinet Pariset (DH)	1–5	Guingamp (L1)
Martigues (Nat.)	1–0	Amiens (L2)
Rennes (L1)	3–0	Ajaccio (L1)
ES Lambres (PH)	1–2	Angoulême (Nat.)
Agde (CFA)	0–2	Lille (L1)
Bordeaux (L1)	2–0	Grenoble (L2)
Quevilly (CFA)	1–2	Wasquehal (L2)
Laval (L2)	2–1	Le Havre (L1)
Libourne-Saint-Seurin (CFA)	2–2 (a.e.t.) (12–11 p)	Le Mans (L2)
Lorient (L2)	1–0	Nantes (L1)
Dijon (Nat.)	0–1	Bourg-Péronnas (CFA)
Toulouse (L2)	1–0	Lens (L1)

== Round of 16 ==
Team 1	Score	Team 2
Bourg-Péronnas (CFA)	1–3	Auxerre (L1)
Martigues (Nat.)	2–1	Metz (L2)
Schiltigheim (CFA2)	3–0	Toulouse (L2)
Angoulême (Nat.)	0–0 (a.e.t.) (3–2 p)	Guingamp (L1)
Libourne-Saint-Seurin (CFA)	0–3	Rennes (L1)
Lorient (L2)	1–0	Lille (L1)
Laval (L2)	0–1	Paris Saint-Germain (L1)
Bordeaux (L1)	4–1	Wasquehal (L2)

== Quarter-finals ==
15 March 2003	Schiltigheim (5)	1–2	Rennes (1)	Strasbourg
	Spiewak 3'		Maoulida 74'; Piquionne 88'	Stadium: Stade de la Meinau; Attendance: 25,105; Referee: Gilles Veissière

15 March 2003	Bordeaux (1)	2–0	Lorient (2)	Bordeaux
	Feindouno 58'; Sávio 80'			Stadium: Stade Chaban-Delmas; Attendance: 12,258; Referee: Jean-Charles Cailleux

15 March 2003	Martigues (3)	0–1	Paris Saint-Germain (1)	Martigues
			Ronaldinho 76'	Stadium: Stade Francis Turcan; Attendance: 8,000; Referee: Laurent Duhamel

16 March 2003	Angoulême (3)	0–0 (a.e.t.) (2–4 p)	Auxerre (1)	Poitiers
				Stadium: Stade de la Pépinière; Attendance: 11,052; Referee: Bertrand Layec
	Penalties
	Massolin (penalty scored); Clément (penalty scored)		(penalty scored) Jaurès; (penalty scored) Mexès; (penalty scored) Benjani; (penalty scored) Fadiga

== Semi-finals ==
26 April 2003	Auxerre (1)	2–1	Rennes (1)	Auxerre
	Cissé 42', 90'		Sorlin 63'	Stadium: Stade de l'Abbé Deschamps; Attendance: 18,000; Referee: Eric Poulat

27 April 2003	Paris Saint-Germain (1)	2–0	Bordeaux (1)	Paris
	Ronaldinho 22', 81'			Stadium: Parc des Princes; Attendance: 39,122; Referee: Claude Colombo

== Final ==
31 May 2003
20:45

Paris Saint-Germain	1–2	Auxerre
Leal 21'		Cissé 76'; Boumsong 89'

Stade de France, Saint-Denis
Attendance: 78,316
Referee: Bertrand Layec

== Topscorer ==
Djibril Cissé (6 goals)
