= 1996 Coupe de France final =

Final of the 1995–96 edition of the Coupe de France

- Event: 1995–96 Coupe de France
Auxerre	Nîmes
2	1
- Date: 4 May 1996
- Venue: Parc des Princes, Paris
- Referee: Bernard Saules
- Attendance: 44,921

The 1996 Coupe de France final was a football match held at the Parc des Princes in Paris on 4 May 1996, that saw Auxerre defeat Nîmes 2–1 thanks to goals by Laurent Blanc and Lilian Laslandes.

== Road to the final ==
Auxerre			Round	Nîmes
Opponent	H/A	Result	1995–96 Coupe de France	Opponent	H/A	Result
Bye	—	—	Fifth Round	Lunel	A	5–2 (a.e.t.)
Bye	—	—	Sixth Round	Castelnau Le Crès	A	1–0
Bye	—	—	Seventh Round	Muret	H	3–2
Bye	—	—	Eighth Round	Sète	A	1–0
Lyon	A	1–0	Round of 64	Saint-Priest	H	3–1
Le Mans	A	2–0	Round of 32	Saint-Étienne	H	3–1
Paris SG	H	3–1	Round of 16	Thouars	A	2–0
Valence	A	2–0	Quarter-finals	Strasbourg	H	3–2 (a.e.t.)
Marseille	A	1–1 (a.e.t.); 3−1 pen.	Semi-finals	Montpellier	H	1–0

== Match details ==
4 May 1996
20:00

Auxerre	2–1	Nîmes
Blanc 52'; Laslandes 88'		Belbey 25'

Parc des Princes, Paris
Attendance: 44,921
Referee: Bernard Saules

AJ AUXERRE:
GK	1	(France) Lionel Charbonnier
DF	2	(France) Alain Goma
DF	6	(Madagascar) Franck Rabarivony
DF	3	(Nigeria) Taribo West
DF	5	(France) Laurent Blanc
MF	4	(France) Philippe Violeau
MF	7	(France) Sabri Lamouchi
MF	8	(Algeria) Moussa Saïb	(substituted off) 87'
FW	9	(France) Lilian Laslandes
FW	10	(France) Corentin Martins (c)
FW	11	(France) Bernard Diomède
Substitutes:
MF	14	(France) Christophe Cocard	(substituted on) 87'
Manager:
(France) Guy Roux Assistant Referees: Fourth Official:

NIMES OLYMPIQUE:
GK	(France) Philippe Sence (c)
DF	(France) Franck Touron
DF	(France) Johnny Ecker
DF	(France) Antoine Préget
DF	(France) Olivier Bochu
MF	(France) Cyril Jeunechamp	(substituted off) 92'
MF	(France) Christophe Zugna	(substituted off) 36'
MF	(Algeria) Omar Belbey
FW	(France) Christian Perez
FW	(Algeria) Abder Ramdane	(substituted off) 68'
FW	(France) Nicolas Marx
Substitutes:
DF	(France) Anthony Vosalho	(substituted on) 36'
MF	(France) Éric Sabin	(substituted on) 68'
MF	(France) Ludovic Gros	(substituted on) 92'
Manager:
(France) Pierre Barlaguet

== See also ==
- 1995–96 Coupe de France
