= 1995–96 AJ Auxerre season =

Auxerre
1995–96 season
- President: Jean-Claude Hamel
- Head coach: Guy Roux
- Stadium: Stade de l'Abbé-Deschamps
- Division 1: 1st
- Coupe de France: Winners
- Coupe de la Ligue: Round of 16
- UEFA Cup: Second round
- Top goalscorer: League: Corentin Martins (13); All: Lilian Laslandes (15)
- Average home league attendance: 11,015
Home colours	Away colours

The 1995–96 season was the 90th season in the existence of AJ Auxerre and the club's 16th consecutive season in the top-flight of French football. In addition to the domestic league, Auxerre participated in this season's editions of the Coupe de France, the Coupe de la Ligue and UEFA Cup.

== Season summary ==
Auxerre won Division 1 for the first time in their history, and also won the Coupe de France.

== First team squad ==
Squad at end of season

Note: Flags indicate national team as defined under FIFA eligibility rules; some limited exceptions apply. Players may hold more than one non-FIFA nationality.

No.	Pos.	Nation	Player
—	GK	FRA	Lionel Charbonnier
—	GK	FRA	Fabien Cool
—	GK	FRA	Ronan Le Crom
—	DF	FRA	Laurent Blanc
—	DF	FRA	Frédéric Danjou
—	DF	FRA	Alain Goma
—	DF	FRA	Christian Henna
—	DF	FRA	Franck Rabarivony
—	DF	FRA	Franck Silvestre
—	DF	NGA	Taribo West

No.	Pos.	Nation	Player
—	MF	FRA	Christophe Cocard
—	MF	FRA	Bernard Diomède
—	MF	FRA	Yann Lachuer
—	MF	FRA	Sabri Lamouchi
—	MF	FRA	Corentin Martins
—	MF	FRA	Philippe Violeau
—	MF	ALG	Moussa Saïb
—	MF	ALG	Abdelhafid Tasfaout
—	FW	FRA	Stéphane Guivarc'h
—	FW	FRA	Lilian Laslandes

=== Left club during season ===
Note: Flags indicate national team as defined under FIFA eligibility rules; some limited exceptions apply. Players may hold more than one non-FIFA nationality.

No.	Pos.	Nation	Player
—	FW	FRA	Thomas Deniaud (on loan to Angers)

== Competitions ==
=== Division 1 ===
==== League table ====
Pos	Team	Pld	W	D	L	GF	GA	GD	Pts	Qualification or relegation
1	Auxerre (C)	38	22	6	10	66	30	+36	72	Qualification to Champions League group stage
2	Paris Saint-Germain	38	19	11	8	65	36	+29	68	Qualification to Cup Winners' Cup first round (Note: Paris Saint-Germain qualified for the Cup Winners' Cup as defending champions.)
3	Monaco	38	19	11	8	64	39	+25	68	Qualification to UEFA Cup first round
4	Metz	38	18	11	9	42	30	+12	65	Qualification to UEFA Cup first round
5	Lens	38	16	15	7	45	31	+14	63	Qualification to UEFA Cup first round

Source: Ligue 1
Rules for classification: 1) points; 2) goal difference; 3) number of goals scored.
(C) Champions

==== Results summary ====
Overall								Home						Away					
Pld	W	D	L	GF	GA	GD	Pts	W	D	L	GF	GA	GD	W	D	L	GF	GA	GD
38	22	6	10	66	30	+36	72	14	1	4	37	11	+26	8	5	6	29	19	+10

Source: French Division 1

==== Results by round ====
Round	1	2	3	4	5	6	7	8	9	10	11	12	13	14	15	16	17	18	19	20	21	22	23	24	25	26	27	28	29	30	31	32	33	34	35	36	37	38
Ground	A	H	A	H	A	H	A	H	A	H	A	A	H	A	H	A	H	A	H	A	H	A	H	A	H	A	H	A	H	H	A	H	A	H	A	H	A	H
Result	L	W	D	L	L	W	W	W	W	W	L	W	W	L	L	W	W	W	L	D	L	D	W	W	W	L	W	L	D	W	W	W	W	W	D	W	D	W
Position	15	8	9	12	16	12	8	5	4	3	4	4	3	4	4	4	3	2	2	3	3	3	4	3	2	2	2	2	2	2	2	2	1	1	1	1	1	1

Source: Division 1
A = Away; H = Home; W = Win; D = Draw; L = Loss

==== Matches ====
–

=== UEFA Cup ===
==== First round ====
12 September 1995 First leg	Viking (Norway)	1–1	(France) Auxerre	Stavanger, Norway
	Ulfstein 55'	Report	West 14'	Stadium: Stavanger Stadion; Attendance: 4,097; Referee: Paul Durkin (England)

26 September 1995 Second leg	Auxerre (France)	1–0 (2–1 agg.)	(Norway) Viking	Auxerre, France
	Silvestre 47'	Report		Stadium: Stade de l'Abbé-Deschamps; Attendance: 11,000; Referee: António Almeida Marçal (Portugal)

==== Second round ====
17 October 1995 First leg	Auxerre (France)	0–1	(England) Nottingham Forest	Auxerre, France
		Report	Stone 23'	Stadium: Stade de l'Abbé-Deschamps; Attendance: 17,000; Referee: Pierluigi Collina (Italy)

31 October 1995 Second leg	Nottingham Forest (England)	0–0 (1–0 agg.)	(France) Auxerre	Nottingham, England
		Report		Stadium: City Ground; Attendance: 26,063; Referee: Sergei Khusainov (Russia)
