= Derby du Languedoc =

Football rivalry in France

- Other names: Languedoc derby
- Location: Languedoc-Roussillon
- Teams: Montpellier; Nîmes Olympique
- First meeting: Nîmes 2–0 Montpelliérain (1 July 1933); 1933–34 French Division 1
- Latest meeting: Nîmes 1–1 Montpellier (14 March 2021); 2020–21 Ligue 1
- Stadiums: Stade de la Mosson (Montpellier); Stade des Antonins (Nîmes)

Statistics
- Total meetings: 25
- Most wins: Nîmes (11)
- Most player appearances: See below (5 apps)
- Top scorer: José Parodi (4 goals)
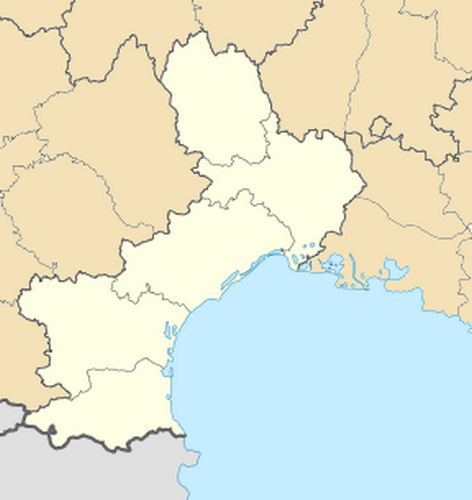

The Derby du Languedoc is a football match contested between French clubs Nîmes Olympique and Montpellier HSC. The name of the derby derives from the fact that Nîmes and Montpellier are the two major clubs in France that are located in the former region of Languedoc-Roussillon.

== History ==
Montpellier play at the Stade de la Mosson, in Montpellier, Nîmes Olympique play at the Stade des Antonins in Nîmes; the two grounds are separated by approximately 53 miles (85 km). The teams have played 25 matches in all competitions; Nîmes Olympique winning 11, Montpellier winning 7 and remaining 7 games were drawn.

Nîmes Olympique was considered the best club in the region from the 1950s until the early 1980s. This leadership is challenged by the rise of Montpellier in the 1970s. The club gradually weakens Nîmes by recovering many important players like Louis Landi, Michel Mézy or the coach Kader Firoud.

== Head-to-head ==
The derby has been contested the most in the top division, with 19 matches played in French Division 1/Ligue 1, Nîmes Olympique won 9 matches, Montpellier won 4 and remaining 6 were drawn, in Ligue 2, Nîmes Olympique won 1, Montpellier won 2 and 1 match was drawn, only 2 matches were played in the cup competitions, 1 in Coupe de France and 1 in Coupe de la Ligue with Nîmes Olympique winning the first one and Montpellier winning the latter.

=== Statistics ===
Competition	Played	Montpellier wins	Draws	Nîmes wins	Montpellier goals	Nîmes goals
Ligue 1	19	4	6	9	25	37
Ligue 2	4	2	1	1	7	4
Coupe de France	1	0	0	1	0	1
Coupe de la Ligue	1	1	0	0	1	0
Total	25	7	7	11	33	42

=== List of matches ===
League

#	Season	Date	Competition	Home Team	Result	Away Team	Stadium	Attendance	H2H
1	1933–34	–	French Division 1	Nîmes	2–0	Montpelliérain	Stade Jean-Bouin	–	+1
2	1933–34	–	French Division 1	Montpelliérain	2–4	Nîmes	Stade de la Croix d'Argent	–	+2
3	1934–35	–	French Division 1	Nîmes	4–5	Montpelliérain	Stade Jean-Bouin	–	+1
4	1934–35	–	French Division 1	Montpelliérain	0–3	Nîmes	Stade de la Croix d'Argent	–	+2
5	1952–53	11 September 1952	French Division 1	Nîmes	4–2	Montpelliérain	Stade Jean-Bouin	–	+3
6	1952–53	25 January 1953	French Division 1	Montpelliérain	2–5	Nîmes	Stade de la Croix d'Argent	–	+4
7	1961–62	15 October 1961	French Division 1	Nîmes	3–1	Montpelliérain	Stade Jean-Bouin	12,348	+5
8	1961–62	25 March 1962	French Division 1	Montpelliérain	3–5	Nîmes	Parc des Sports	18,420	+6
9	1962–63	21 October 1962	French Division 1	Montpelliérain	1–1	Nîmes	Parc des Sports	15,613	+6
10	1962–63	24 March 1963	French Division 1	Nîmes	1–1	Montpelliérain	Stade Jean-Bouin	6,518	+6
11	1991–92	5 October 1991	French Division 1	Montpellier	0–0	Nîmes	Stade de la Mosson	20,000	+6
12	1991–92	24 March 1963	French Division 1	Nîmes	2–1	Montpellier	Stade des Costières	16,965	+7
13	1992–93	6 October 1992	French Division 1	Nîmes	4–2	Montpellier	Stade des Costières	10,586	+7
14	1992–93	12 March 1993	French Division 1	Montpellier	1–0	Nîmes	Stade de la Mosson	11,833	+6
15	2000–01	12 August 2000	French Division 2	Nîmes	0–2	Montpellier	Stade des Costières	16,400	+5
16	2000–01	30 November 2000	French Division 2	Montpellier	3–1	Nîmes	Stade de la Mosson	16,761	+4
17	2008–09	31 October 2008	Ligue 2	Montpellier	1–1	Nîmes	Stade de la Mosson	16,115	+4
18	2008–09	10 April 2009	Ligue 2	Nîmes	2–1	Montpellier	Stade des Costières	14,853	+5
19	2018–19	30 September 2018	Ligue 1	Montpellier	3–0	Nîmes	Stade de la Mosson	20,054	+4
20	2018–19	3 February 2019	Ligue 1	Nîmes	1–1	Montpellier	Stade des Costières	18,045	+4
21	2019–20	25 September 2019	Ligue 1	Montpellier	3–0	Nîmes	Stade de la Mosson	16,445	+4
–	2019–20	11 April 2020	Ligue 1	Nîmes	DNP	Montpellier	Stade des Costières	–	+4
23	2020–21	4 October 2020	Ligue 1	Montpellier	0–1	Nîmes	Stade de la Mosson	0 (Note: Played behind closed doors due to COVID-19.)	+5
24	2020–21	14 March 2021	Ligue 1	Nîmes	1–1	Montpellier	Stade des Costières	0 (Note: Played behind closed doors due to COVID-19.)	+5

Cup

#	Season	Date	Competition	Home Team	Result	Away Team	Stadium	Attendance	Round
1	1995–96	14 April 1996	Coupe de France	Nîmes	1–0	Montpellier	Stade des Costières	21,366	Semi-finals
2	1996–97	10 January 1997	Coupe de la Ligue	Nîmes	0–1	Montpellier	Stade des Costières	8,000	Round of 16

== Records ==
=== All-time top goalscorers ===
Rank	Nation	Player	Club(s)	Years	League	Coupe de France	Coupe de la Ligue	Overall
1	(Paraguay)	José Parodi	Nîmes	1961–1967	4	0	0	4
2	(Algeria)	Andy Delort	Nîmes	2009–2010	0	0	0	3
2	(Algeria)	Andy Delort	Montpellier	2018–2019, 2019–2021	3	0	0	3
3	(France)	Philippe Vercruysse	Nîmes	1991–1993	2	0	0	2
3	(Algeria)	Salah Djebaïli	Nîmes	1955–1966	2	0	0	2
3	(France)	Toifilou Maoulida	Montpellier	1997–2001	2	0	0	2
3	(France)	Toifilou Maoulida	Nîmes	2014–2016	0	0	0	2

=== All-time most appearances ===
Rank	Nation	Player	Club(s)	Years	League	Coupe de France	Coupe de la Ligue	Overall
1	(Algeria)	Andy Delort	Nîmes	2009–2010	0	0	0	5
1	(Algeria)	Andy Delort	Montpellier	2018–2019, 2019–2021	5	0	0	5
1	(France)	Gaëtan Laborde	Montpellier	2018–2021	5	0	0	5
1	(France)	Renaud Ripart	Nîmes	2011–2021	5	0	0	5
1	(France)	Daniel Congré	Montpellier	2012–2021	5	0	0	5
1	(France)	Fabien Lefèvre	Montpellier	1991–1997, 2000–2004	3	1	1	5
1	(France)	Florent Mollet	Montpellier	2018–2022	5	0	0	5
1	(France)	Franck Touron	Nîmes	1989–1994, 1995–1997	4	1	0	5

=== Results ===
==== Most total goals in a match ====
Goals	Result	Date	Competition
9	Nîmes 4–5 Montpelliérain	1935	1934–35 French Division 1
8	Montpelliérain 3–5 Nîmes	25 March 1962	1961–62 French Division 1
7	Montpelliérain 2–5 Nîmes	25 January 1953	1952–53 French Division 1
6	Nîmes 4–2 Montpellier	6 October 1992	1992–93 French Division 1

==== Longest runs ====
===== Most consecutive wins =====
Games	Club	Period
5	Nîmes	1935 – 25 March 1962
3	Montpellier	10 January 1997 – 30 November 2000

===== Most consecutive matches without a draw =====
Games	Period
8	1933 – 25 March 1962
6	6 October 1992 – 30 November 2000

===== Longest undefeated runs =====
Games	Club	Period
10	Nîmes	1935 – 6 October 1992
4	Montpellier	10 January 1997 – 31 October 2008

===== Most consecutive matches without conceding a goal =====
Games	Club	Period
2	Montpellier	10 January 1997 – 12 August 2000

===== Most consecutive games scoring =====
Games	Club	Period
11	Nîmes	1933 – 24 March 1963
8	Montpellier	10 January 1997 – 25 September 2019

== Players who played for both clubs ==
Player	Montpellier career			Nîmes career		
Player	Span	Apps	Goals	Span	Apps	Goals
(France) Michel Mézy	1979–1982	78	1	1965–1975, 1977–1979	319	20
(France) Laurent Blanc	1983–1991	243	76	1992–1993	29	1
(France) Eric Cantona	1989–1990	33	10	1991	16	2
(France) Toifilou Maoulida	1997–2001	118	26	2014–2016	74	16
(France) Omar Belbey	2000–2002	43	1	1995–2000	113	1
(Algeria) Andy Delort	2018–2019, 2019–2021, 2025	115	47	2009–2010	3	0
(France) Téji Savanier	2019–2026	210	50	2015–2019	132	22
(France) **Théo Sainte-Luce**	2022–present	68	4	2019–2022	34	2

Players currently playing for their respective Derby du Languedoc club are written in bold.
