= List of Olympique Lyonnais managers =

Olympique Lyonnais are a professional football club based in Lyon, Rhône, France, who currently play in Ligue 1, the highest level of French football. This chronological list comprises all those who have held the position of manager of the first team of Lyon since their founding on 26 May 1950.

== Managers ==
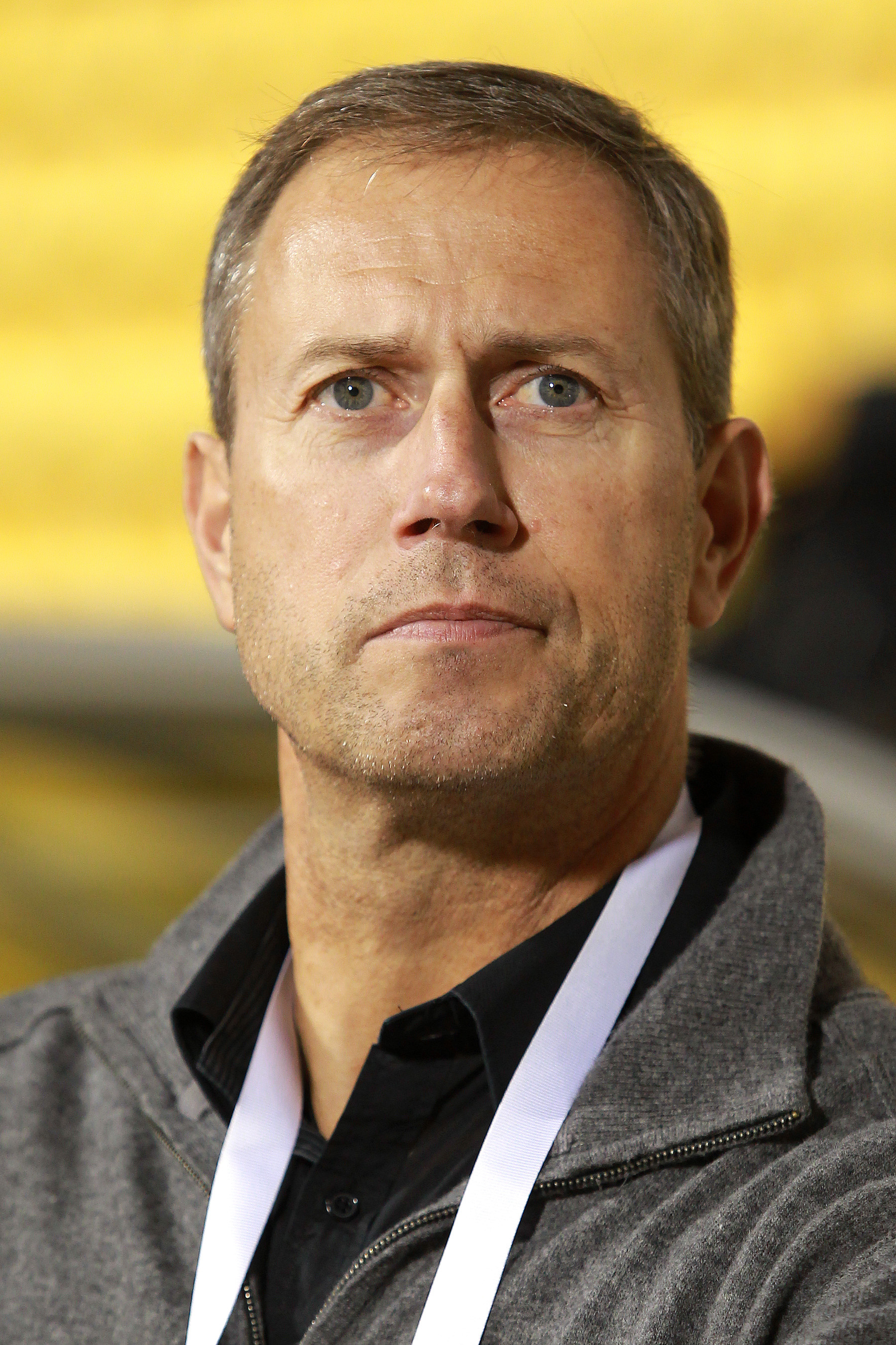
Alain Perrin, first Lyon manager to win the double.

Name	Nationality	Period
Oscar Heisserer	France	1950–54
Julien Darui	France	1954–55
Lucien Troupel	France	1955–59
Gaby Robert	France	1959–61
Manuel Fernandez	France	1961–62
Lucien Jasseron	France	1962–66
Louis Hon	France	1966–68
Aimé Mignot	France	1968–76
Aimé Jacquet	France	1976–80
Jean-Pierre Destrumelle	France	1980–81
Vladica Kovačević	Yugoslavia	1981–83
Robert Herbin	France	1 March 1983 – 30 June 1985
Robert Nouzaret	France	1 July 1985 – 30 June 1987
Denis Papas	France	1987–88
Marcel Le Borgne	France	1988
Raymond Domenech	France	1 July 1988 – 30 June 1993
Jean Tigana	France	1 July 1993 – 30 June 1995
Guy Stéphan	France	1 July 1995 – 1 November 1996
Bernard Lacombe	France	2 December 1996 – 30 June 2000
Jacques Santini	France	1 July 2000 – 30 June 2002
Paul Le Guen	France	1 July 2002 – 30 June 2005
Gérard Houllier	France	1 July 2005 – 25 May 2007
Alain Perrin	France	1 July 2007 – 16 June 2008
Claude Puel	France	1 July 2008 – 20 June 2011
Rémi Garde	France	21 June 2011 – 12 May 2014
Hubert Fournier	France	23 May 2014 – 24 December 2015
Bruno Génésio	France	24 December 2015 – 24 May 2019
Sylvinho	Brazil	25 May 2019 – 7 October 2019
Rudi Garcia	France	14 October 2019 – 24 May 2021
Peter Bosz	Netherlands	29 May 2021 – 9 October 2022
Laurent Blanc	France	10 October 2022 – 11 September 2023
Fabio Grosso	Italy	18 September 2023 – 30 November 2023
Pierre Sage	France	30 November 2023 – 27 January 2025
Paulo Fonseca	Portugal	31 January 2025 – 4 November 2026
Carlos Vicens	Spain	9 November 2026 – Present
