= Football rivalries in France =

In many countries the term local derby, or simply derby, means a sporting fixture between two (generally local) rivals, particularly in Association Football. In North America, crosstown rivalry is a more common term.

Although there are no strict rules, derby games in France are commonly divided into three categories – derbies, local derbies and classicos (originally a Spanish expression).

A derby is a game involving two teams from neighbouring cities, a local derby would involve two teams from the same city and a classico involves two teams from two cities quite far apart geographically which have developed a great rivalry along the years – such as PSG and Marseille in football for example.

== Local derbies ==
Local derbies are extremely rare in France, especially in football. There are two main reasons for this.

Before the Second World War, derbies were quite common but they disappeared when new national leagues were artificially created by the Vichy regime, involving only one team from each region. This fateful decision caused many clubs to merge or temporarily disappear and even though some clubs were relaunched after the war the damage had already been done.

The other reason is purely financial. Because clubs in France rely heavily on public subsidies from local and regional councils, they have to share this money with other clubs from the same region or town. As a result of this, it is usually more economically sensible for two clubs from the same area to merge rather than to compete against each other in the same league.

The 2025–26 Ligue 1 season saw a Parisian derby between Paris Saint-Germain and Paris FC. It was the first season where two teams from the same city played each other in the top flight since the 1989–90 season, when Paris Saint-Germain and Racing Paris were in the top flight simultaneously. Previously, a short-held rivalry occurred in the 1970s between Paris FC and Paris Saint-Germain, owing to their merger and split in 1970.

In the 1930s, there was a fierce rivalry between Ligue 1 founding members CA Paris, Racing Paris and Red Star. Originally both founded in Paris, Racing and Red Star have moved out to the suburbs since then. However, back in the 1990s Racing did share PSG's Parisian stadium during their brief spell in Ligue 1. US Créteil was founded in the southern suburbs of Paris to compete with the other areas of the city, and had remained in the same suburb throughout its history.

Prior to this, derby games outside Paris were more common, particularly in the 1930s. For example, Lille was the home of SC Fives and Olympique Lillois (both merged in 1944 and became Lille OSC). Another example was Roubaix, home of Excelsior and RC Roubaix who even met in the 1933 final of the Coupe de France, Excelsior being the winner (both merged with Tourcoing in 1945, RCR unmerged in 1963 and Excelsior in 1970). Between 1930 and 1960 there was a regular lower league local derby between FC Ajaccio and AC Ajaccio.

The only regularly occurring city derbies and which uphold their rivalries in recent years in France are the Parisian derbies between Red Star, US Créteil and Paris FC in the second and third tiers, and the Ajaccio derby between AC Ajaccio and GFCO Ajaccio.

- Ajaccio – AC Ajaccio (L2) vs Gazélec Ajaccio (R2).
- Paris – Paris Saint-Germain (L1) vs Paris FC (L1) vs Racing Paris (N3) vs Red Star (L2) vs US Créteil (N2) vs Paris 13 Atletico (N)

Clubs from the same city but playing in different leagues can meet in the Coupe de France however, even if, this rarely happens.

Taking into account all the clubs playing were at least semi-professional level (with the exception of Gazélec Ajaccio, who were administratively relegated to Regional 2), the top five divisions; Ligue 1, Ligue 2, National, National 2 and National 3, additionally the following derbies could occur, although they do not evoke any emotion among fans:

- Bastia – SC Bastia (L2) vs. CA Bastia vs. ÉF Bastia.
- Lille – Lille OSC (L1) vs. Lille Fives OS vs FC Lille Sud.
- Bordeaux – Girondins de Bordeaux (N2) vs. Stade Bordelais (R1).
- Lyon – Olympique Lyonnais (L1) vs. Lyon-La Duchère (N3).
- Marseille – Olympique de Marseille (L1) vs. Endoume Marseille (R1) vs. Athlético Marseille.
- Saint-Étienne - AS Saint-Étienne (L2) vs. FC Saint-Étienne
- Reims – Stade de Reims (L1) vs. Reims Sainte-Anne (R1).
- Strasbourg – RC Strasbourg (L1) vs. Vauban Strasbourg (R1).
- Toulouse – Toulouse FC (L1) vs. Toulouse Fontaines.

== Regional derbies ==
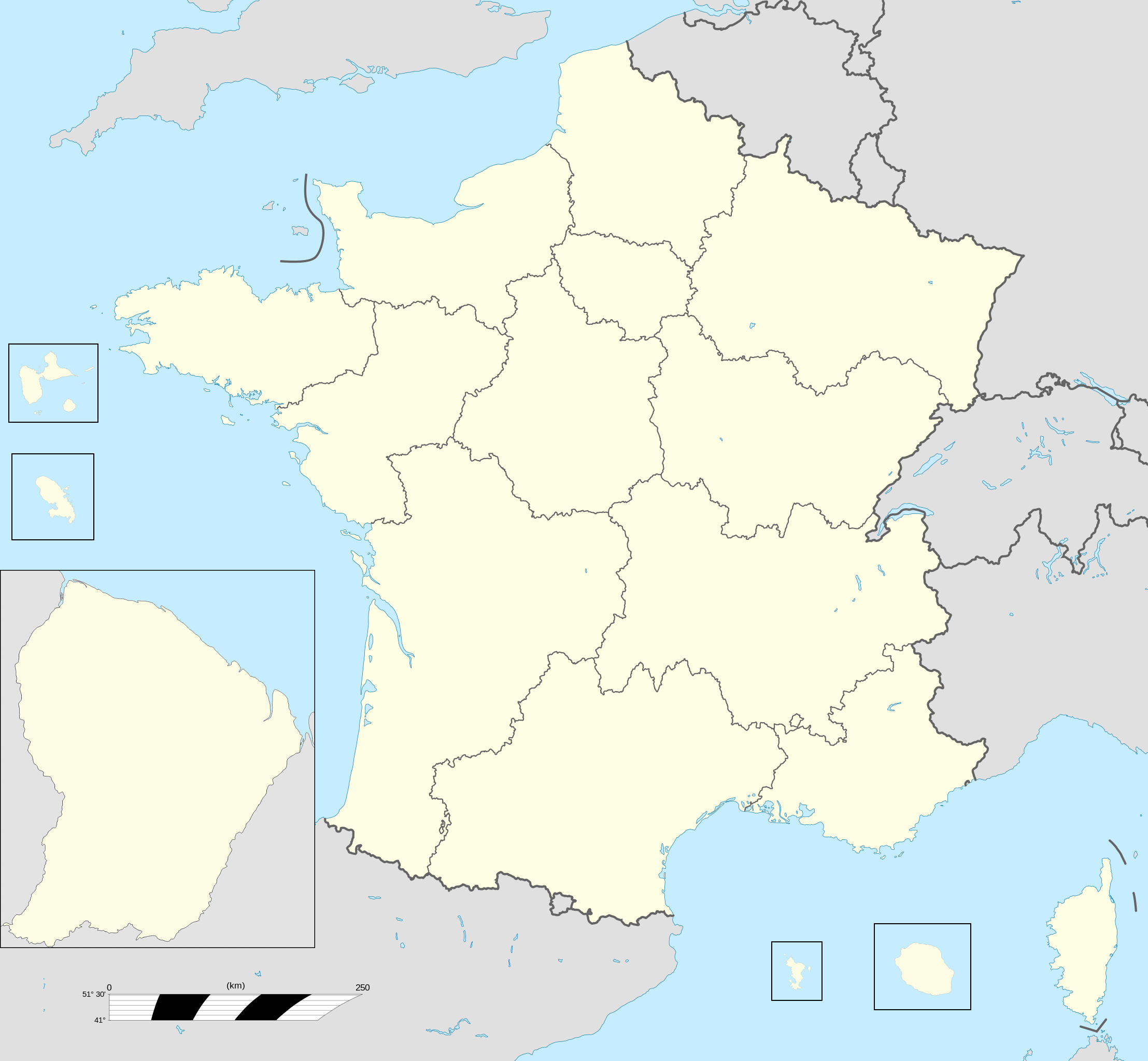

Whereas city derbies are quite rare in France, local regional derbies on the other hand are very common. And because French people usually identify primarily with their town or region (Esprit de clocher), these local derbies do attract much attention.

The atmosphere surrounding local derbies can be electric, while remaining relatively good-humoured most of the time. On a national level some derbies are considered more important than others – games between Saint-Étienne and Lyon or Lille and Lens are eagerly awaited affairs, whereas a game between Rouen and Le Havre for example, would receive less national coverage.

Notable local derbies include:

- Derby de la N77: AJ Auxerre vs Troyes AC
- Derby de la Garonne: Toulouse FC vs. FC Girondins de Bordeaux
- Derby Lorrain: AS Nancy Lorraine vs. FC Metz
- Derby du Nord: RC Lens vs. Lille OSC; can also include Valenciennes FC or Amiens SC
- Derby Corse: SC Bastia vs. AC Ajaccio or Gazélec Ajaccio
- Derby Rhônalpin: Olympique Lyonnais vs. AS Saint-Étienne; can also include Grenoble
- Derby Breton: Stade Rennais vs FC Nantes vs. EA Guingamp vs. FC Lorient vs. Stade Brestois vs. Quimper vs. US Saint-Malo vs. Vannes OC
- Derby de l'ouest: FC Nantes vs SCO Angers.
- Derby de la Côte d'Opale: US Boulogne vs. US Dunkerque
- Derby de l'Atlantique: FC Nantes vs. Girondins de Bordeaux.
- Derby de l'Anjou: SCO Angers vs. Stade Lavallois.
- Derby Provençal: Olympique de Marseille vs. Sporting Toulon Var.
- Derby de la Provence: AC Arles-Avignon vs. FC Istres.
- Derby du Languedoc: Montpellier HSC vs. Nîmes Olympique.
- Derby des Ardennes: CS Sedan Ardennes vs. Troyes AC.
- Derby de la Côte d'Azur: AS Monaco vs. OGC Nice
- Derby des Alpes-Maritimes – OGC Nice vs AS Cannes.
- Derby Normand: SM Caen vs. Le Havre AC.
- Derby de l'Est: FC Metz vs. RC Strasbourg.
- Derby de la Mediterranée – OGC Nice vs. SC Bastia, can also refer to OGC Nice vs. Olympique de Marseille
- Derby de l'Alsace: FC Mulhouse vs. RC Strasbourg vs. SR Colmar
- Derby de la Normandie: Le Havre AC vs. SM Caen can also include AS Cherbourg and US Quevilly (use to include FC Rouen, which merged with US Quevilly)
- Derby de Champagne-Ardenne – Stade Reims vs. CS Sedan Ardennes or Troyes AC
- Derby de Bourgogne: Dijon FCO vs. AJ Auxerre can also include FC Gueugnon
- Derby du Maine: Stade Lavallois vs. Le Mans
- Derby du Centre: Tours FC vs. Châteauroux vs. US Orléans
- Derby des rillettes: Tours FC vs. Le Mans Union Club 72
- Derby de l'Etang de Berre: FC Istres vs. FC Martigues

== Nationwide rivalries ==
Major rivalries in France include:

- Le Classique – Olympique de Marseille vs Paris Saint-Germain

Heated until the mid-2000s, with much tension and aggressive behaviour by supporters of both teams, the rivalry is softening, as PSG has seen its financial abilities skyrocket since the purchase of the club by Qatar Sports Investments, owned by the Qatar Investment Authority.

- Choc des Olympiques – Olympique Lyonnais vs Olympique de Marseille

The French major football broadcaster Canal+ calls this game "Olympico" referring also to El Clásico. The rivalry is often cited as being particularly important as both clubs are of high standard in French football and the championship is regularly decided between the two. Marseille and Lyon (along with Saint-Étienne) are the only French clubs to have won the French first division four straight times with Marseille doing it twice.

- Olympique de Marseille vs AS Saint-Étienne

Before Paris Saint-Germain started to dominate French football in the 2010, Marseille and Saint-Étienne were the teams with the most Ligue 1 titles. The teams dominated French football in the 1960s and 1970s. Today, though, this rivalry is not considered a genuine derby by fans and players. Marseille last won the league in 2010, whereas Saint-Étienne has not won a French league title since 1981.

- FC Nantes vs AS Saint-Étienne

These two teams are among the most successful in French football, having won 18 championships between them since 1932 – 8 for Nantes, 10 for Saint-Etienne. They dominated the French First Division from 1963 to 1983, with only five titles not being awarded to one of the two. During that period, the clashes between the two clubs were the climax of the season and were eagerly anticipated by national networks, as they would be crucial to the final classification. Each team developed a specific identity: "Les Verts", representing the working-class mining and industrial city of Saint-Etienne played tough and very intense football, whereas the players of Nantes, "Les Canaris", created a style called "jeu à la nantaise" based on technical abilities, ball possession and tactical cohesion. That style of play remains iconic of Nantes to this day. Notable players for the two teams during this period were Henri Michel, Maxime Bossis, Jean-Paul Bertrand-Demanes, Loïc Amisse, Vahid Halilhodžić under the directing of José Arribas, Jean Vincent, Jean-Claude Suaudeau for Nantes, and Jean-Michel Larqué, Hervé Revelli, Johnny Rep and Michel Platini for Saint-Etienne, coached by Robert Herbin.

This period of dominance ended with the relegation of Saint-Etienne in 1983. Nantes won another two championships in 1995 and 2001 heralding the same identity of play, but has declined since. As a consequence, this match is no longer considered a derby.

== See also ==
- Association football and politics
- Culture of France
- Football hooliganism#France
- France–Germany football rivalry
- France–Italy football rivalry
