= Manuel Fernandez =

Manuel Fernández or Fernandez may refer to:

== Arts and literature ==
- Manuel Fernández Álvarez (1921–2010), Spanish historian and writer
- Manuel Fernández Caballero (1835–1906), Spanish composer
- Manuel Fernández Juncos (1846–1928), Spanish journalist and author

== Government and politics ==
- Manuel Fernández Ilarraza (1940–2026), Spanish politician
- Manuel Fernández Mármol (1912–1983), politician from the Dominican Republic
- Manuel Fernández Pradel (1826–1906), Chilean surveyor and politician
- Manuel Fernández Supervielle (1894–1947), Cuban politician and attorney

== Military ==
- Manuel Fernández Castrillón (1780s–1836), Mexican general
- Manuel Fernández Silvestre (1871–1921), Spanish general
- Manuel J. Fernandez (1925–1980), American pilot in Korean War

== Sports ==
=== Association football (soccer) ===
- Manuel Fernandez (footballer) (1922–1971), French-Spanish football defender
- Pahiño (Manuel Fernández Fernández, 1923–2012), Spanish footballer
- Manuel Fernández Arroyo (born 2001), Spanish footballer
- Manuel Fernández Mora (1932–2017), Spanish football player and manager
- Manuel Fernández Muñiz (born 1986), Spanish footballer
- Manuel Fernández (Argentine footballer) (born 1983), Argentine football manager and former footballer
- Manuel Fernández (Uruguayan footballer) (born 1989), Uruguayan footballer

=== Other sports ===
- Manuel José Fernández (born 1927), Argentine Olympic shooter
- Manuel Fernández (rower) (fl. 1940s), Argentine Olympic rower
- Manuel Fernández (field hockey) (born 1948), Mexican field hockey player
- Manuel Montoya Fernández (1959–2024), Spanish handball manager
- Manuel Fernández Ginés (born 1971), Spanish cyclist
- Manuel Fernández Saro (born 1975), Spanish show jumping rider

== Others ==
- Manuel Fernández de Santa Cruz (1637–1699), Roman Catholic prelate in New Spain
- Manuel Fernandez (businessman) (born 1946), American businessman

== See also ==
- Manny Fernandez (disambiguation)
- Manuel Fernandes (disambiguation)
