= Olivier Bochu =

French footballer (born 1971)

Personal information
- Date of birth: 1 August 1971 (age 55)
- Place of birth: Grenoble, France
- Height: 1.81 m (5 ft 11 in) (Note: WorldFootball.net claims he is 1.82 m tall, while Croix de Savoie Fans claims he is 1.81 m tall.)
- Position: Defender

Senior career*
| Years | Team | Apps | (Gls) |
| 1991–1994 | Grenoble | | |
| 1994–1995 | Caen | 8 | (0) |
| 1995–1996 | Nîmes | | |
| 1996–1999 | Martigues | 57 | (4) |
| 1999–2001 | Beauvais | | |
| 2001–2002 | Gueugnon | 23 | (1) |
| 2002–2004 | Istres | 48 | (2) |
| 2004–2006 | Croix-de-Savoie | 46 | (0) |
- * Club domestic league appearances and goals

Olivier Bochu (born 1 August 1971) is a French former professional footballer who played as a defender.

== Personal life ==
On 8 January 2022, Bochu was present at his former club Grenoble's Stade des Alpes for the occasion of a Club des Anciens gathering during a match against Auxerre.

== Honours ==
Caen

- Division 2: 1995–96

Nîmes

- Coupe de France runner-up: 1995–96

Beauvais

- Championnat National: 1999–2000
