= Manuel Fernandes =

Manuel Fernandes may refer to:

- Manuel Fernandes (rower) (born 1967), rower who represented Portugal at the 1996 Summer Olympics
- Manuel Fernandes (footballer, born 1951) (1951–2024), former Portuguese football forward during the late 1970s and 1980s, later a manager
- Manuel Fernandes (footballer, born 1986), Portuguese football midfielder
- Manuel Fernandes (lawyer), Portuguese lawyer, ad-hoc judge for the International Court of Justice in a 1955-1960 case

== See also ==
- Manuel Fernandez (disambiguation)
- Manny Fernandez (disambiguation)
