= Ewald Lienen =

German football manager and former player (born 1953)

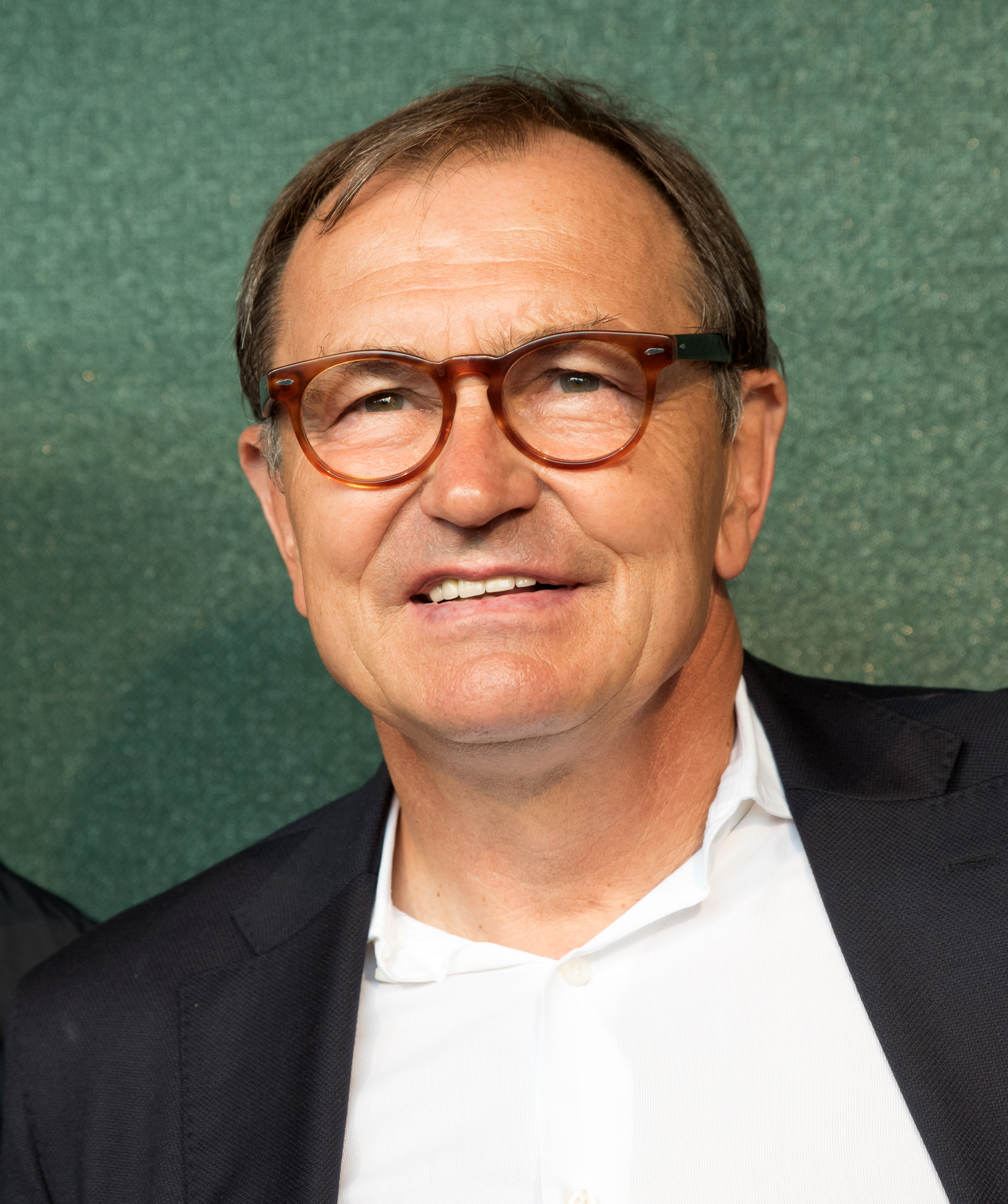
- Lienen in 2016

Personal information
- Date of birth: 28 November 1953 (age 72)
- Place of birth: Liemke, North Rhine-Westphalia, West Germany
- Height: 1.76 m (5 ft 9 in)
- Position: Midfielder

Youth career
- 1961–1971: VfB Schloß Holte

Senior career*
Years	Team	Apps	(Gls)
1971–1974	VfB Schloß Holte	33	(13)
1974–1977	Arminia Bielefeld	93	(24)
1977–1981	Borussia Mönchengladbach	118	(23)
1981–1983	Arminia Bielefeld	60	(12)
1983–1987	Borussia Mönchengladbach	126	(13)
1987–1992	MSV Duisburg	154	(23)
Total		551	(95)

Managerial career
- 1989–1993: MSV Duisburg II
- 1993–1994: MSV Duisburg
- 1995–1997: CD Tenerife (assistant)
- 1997–1999: Hansa Rostock
- 1999–2002: 1. FC Köln
- 2002: CD Tenerife
- 2003: Borussia Mönchengladbach
- 2004–2005: Hannover 96
- 2006–2008: Panionios
- 2009–2010: 1860 Munich
- 2010: Olympiacos
- 2010–2011: Arminia Bielefeld
- 2012–2013: AEK Athens
- 2013–2014: Oțelul Galați
- 2014–2017: FC St. Pauli
- * Club domestic league appearances and goals

Ewald Lienen (born 28 November 1953) is a German football manager and former player. His last job was technical director of FC St. Pauli.

== Playing career ==
Lienen began his professional career at Arminia Bielefeld of the 2. Bundesliga North in 1974. After three seasons, he moved up to the top flight with Borussia Mönchengladbach. The club had just won three successive titles, but Lienen did not manage to achieve this as the team finished runners-up in his first season then failed to mount a title challenge in the subsequent years.

However, Europe was to prove a more successful venture as the club's runners-up finish of 1977–78 qualified them for the UEFA Cup. This, they duly lifted beating Red Star Belgrade 2–1 on aggregate in the final in May 1979. Lienen played in the final, and in each of the previous rounds, scoring two goals along the way (against Manchester City and future club MSV Duisburg).

As holders, they were entered into the following season's tournament, where Lienen again would make it through to the UEFA Cup final. This time, he was not to capture the prize as the team frustratingly lost on away goals to countrymen Eintracht Frankfurt. Lienen again played in all rounds of the trophy and again chipped in with two goals (against Viking and Saint Étienne).

After a further season here, he returned to Arminia Bielefeld, newly promoted to the Bundesliga. The club managed to survive and stabilise as a top-flight team during Lienen's spell here in the early 1980s. On 14 August 1981, Lienen suffered a severe injury, as Norbert Siegmann of Werder Bremen slit his thigh open with his studs resulting in an open deep wound of 25 cm (10 in), exposing his muscles and femur. The wound required 23 stitches; nevertheless, after just 17 days, Lienen started practicing again.

After two seasons with Bielefeld, Lienen decided to move back to Borussia Mönchengladbach. Here, he and the team achieved a string of top-four finishes but fell short of collecting a league title medal. He did, however, play in the 1984 DFB-Pokal final where he narrowly missed out as the team lost on penalties to Bayern Munich.

In Summer 1987, Lienen left Borussia Mönchengladbach to set up a union for professional footballers in Duisburg, along with Benno Möhlmann and Frank Pagelsdorf. He also concentrated on studying for a football coaching license, which he achieved with an A grade in 1989.

Meanwhile, he also continued his footballing career at MSV Duisburg of the Oberliga, winning promotion on the second attempt to the 2. Bundesliga in 1989. He won promotion again to the top flight two years later and played out a final year in the Bundesliga. When the club suffered relegation in May 1992, Lienen retired.

== Management career ==
=== Early career (1989–1997) ===
Lienen remained at MSV Duisburg after ending his playing days, coaching the club's amateurs from 1 July 1989 to 22 March 1993. He quickly got the opportunity to move up into the first team management on 22 March 1993, after the club regained its Bundesliga status. His first season coaching at this level saw him attain a comfortable ninth-place finish in the 1993–94 season. The next year started less favourably though, and saw MSV Duisburg rock bottom by November (with just two points from 22). Lienen was fired on 1 November 1994 after a 0–5 home defeat to Hamburger SV on 30 October 1994. He finished his reign with a record of 25 wins, 14 draws, and 26 losses in 65 matches.

He then accepted the invitation of his former Borussia Mönchengladbach coach Jupp Heynckes to join him at Spanish club CD Tenerife as his assistant. The team achieved an excellent fifth place spot in 1994–95 in La Liga. The following season was not as spectacular but still a solid tenth-place position.

=== Hansa Rostock, 1. FC Köln, Spain, and back to Germany (1997–2005) ===
When Heynckes left Tenerife to move to Real Madrid C.F., Lienen's time in Spain was up and he returned to his homeland as head coach of Hansa Rostock. He started on 1 July 1997.

Lienen led the club to a sixth-place finish in the 1997–98 season. The next season proved a far trickier affair as the club sat in the relegation zone throughout the majority of the campaign. Lienen paid the price on 8 March 1999 for a 1–4 away defeat by MSV Duisburg on 5 March 1999. The club had only won one of their last 14 matches. He finished his reign with 18 wins, 18 draws, and 24 losses in 60 matches.

Another opportunity soon fell his way as 1. FC Köln, newly relegated to the 2. Bundesliga, called on his services. His first match was a 7–1 win against SG Wattenscheid 09 in the DFB-Pokal. Lienen immediately returned the club to the Bundesliga, as champions in his first season. The 2000–01 season saw them finish a comfortable tenth, but the next season proved tougher and they slipped back down to the second tier, ending Lienen's time here. He was sacked on 28 January 2002. He finished his tenure with a record of 38 wins, 24 draws, and 32 losses in 94 matches.

He returned to Spain in the following season, when CD Tenerife returned to him after suffering relegation. His first match was a 1–1 draw against Compostela on 31 August 2002. His spell back in the Canary Islands was less successful as before as the team failed to mount a promotion challenge. After a string of poor results, Lienen was fired in January 2003, just six months after his appointment. His final match was a 2–0 loss against Real Murcia on 18 January 2003.

Lienen was not on the sideline for long, as his former club Borussia Mönchengladbach looked to him after the sudden resignation of Hans Meyer and hired Lienen on 1 March 2003. The club had slumped into the relegation zone, but Lienen stabilised them in their remaining 11 games and moved them up to 12th. He was retained for the next season, but after a weak start (one win in six), he was replaced by Holger Fach on 21 September 2003. He finished with a record of seven wins, five draws, and six losses in 18 matches.

After a six-month absence from the Bundesliga, Lienen was recruited by Hannover 96 on 8 March 2004 after their dismissal of Ralf Rangnick. The club were flirting with the drop, but Lienen again proved adept at taking over in such circumstances, as he maintained the club's top-flight status with a 14th-place finish. The 2004–05 season was Hannover's best Bundesliga finish up to that time, as they recorded a 10th-place position. The next season began poorly though, and hopes of building on the previous campaign's strong outcome evaporated. The club acted quickly and fired Lienen on 9 November 2005, after 12 games. His tenure finished with 22 wins, 17 draws, and 24 losses.

=== Greece and Germany (2006–2011) ===
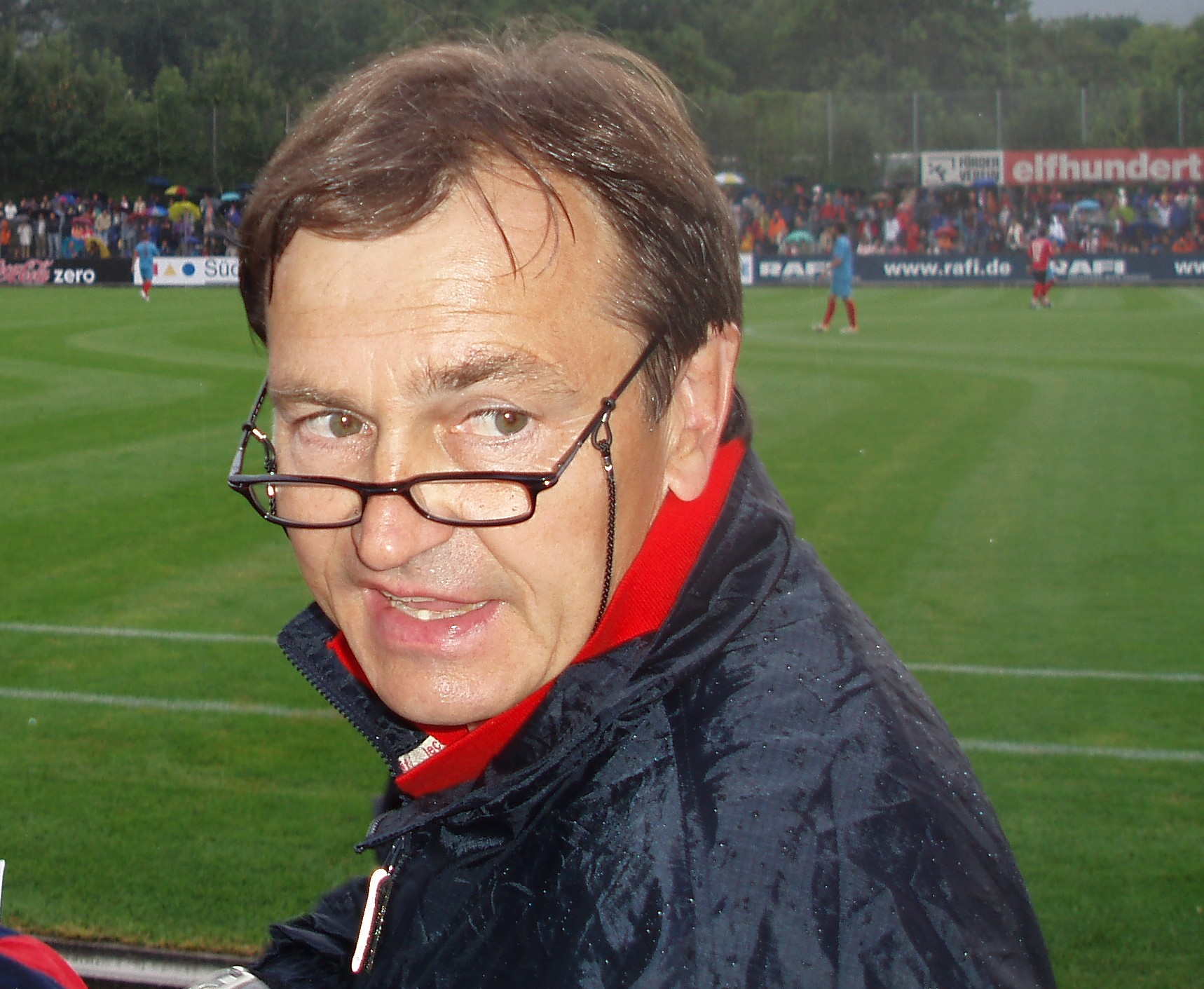
Lienen in 2006

Lienen again looked abroad for his next position, and headed for a new challenge in the Greek Super League with Panionios for the 2006–07 season. His first match as manager was a 0–0 draw against Iraklis. His first season in Athens was a success, as the club finished fifth, enough to qualify for the UEFA Cup. They knocked out Sochaux-Montbéliard 2–1 on aggregate. to qualify for the group stage. The following season was equally successful for the club, again finishing in fifth position, only to lose their UEFA Cup berth on the following playoff.

He was released from the Greek club by mutual consent on 11 November 2008. This followed the club's decision to sack his assistant, Abder Ramdane because of an incident with striker Lambros Choutos. Panionios cited various disagreements from the start of the season, as well as the tension developing between players and staff, as the reasons for this decision. His final match was a 2–0 loss against PAOK.

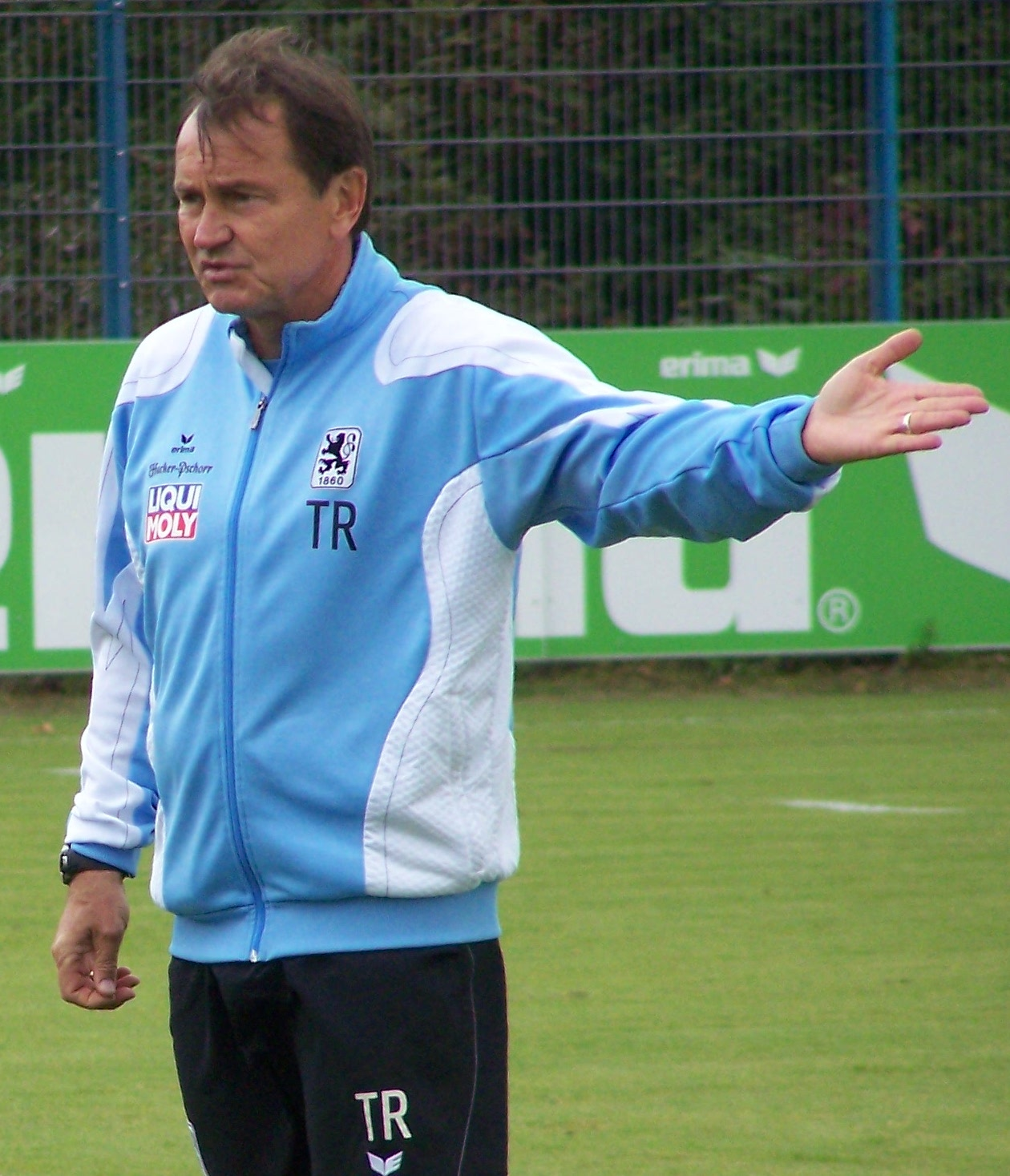
Lienen as manager of TSV 1860 Munich in 2009

On 13 May 2009, he was named as the new manager of 1860 Munich. Lienen and 1860 Munich agreed to mutually terminate his contract on 17 June 2010 so he could make the move to Olympiakos. He finished his tenure with 15 wins, eight draws, and 16 losses.

Lienen became the new head coach of Olympiacos on 17 June 2010. He defeated Besa Kavajë 11–1 on aggregate in the second qualifying round of the Europa League. On 6 August 2010, the German coach was fired by Olympiacos because of the club's elimination from the Europa League after Olympiacos lost against Maccabi Tel Aviv.

On 8 November 2010 he was named the successor of Christian Ziege at Arminia Bielefeld, Lienen decided not to be manager of the club if they are relegated. however Bielefeld were relegated to the 3. Liga after only four wins in the 2010–11 season, three of which were under Lienen (one of which was won as VfL Osnabrück scored two own goals, resulting in Bielefeld winning 2–1). On 18 April 2011, Arminia announced that Markus von Ahlen would replace Lienen starting in the 2011–12 season. He finish his tenure with three wins, seven draws, and 13 losses.

=== Third stint in Greece and to Romania (2012–2013) ===
Lienen became AEK Athens's manager. His first match was a 1–0 loss to PAOK. He was sacked on 10 April 2013 while the club was a point above the relegation zone with two matches remaining.

On 6 November 2013, Lienen was appointed as the new manager of Romanian Liga I club Oțelul Galați on a two-year contract. His first match was a 1–0 loss to Politehnica Timișoara. On 16 May 2014, he managed to save Oțelul Galați from relegation, a team that won the title three years earlier, and he imposed a good and spectacular football at the team. Also he is very appreciated by the Romanian fans. He ended his contract after only one season.

=== FC St. Pauli (2014–2017) ===
He was hired as the head coach of FC St. Pauli on 16 December 2014. His first match was a 2–1 loss to FC Ingolstadt 04 on 17 December 2014. His first win was a 3–1 against VfR Aalen on 20 December 2014 in his home debut. Then they went on a four match winless streak. During this time, St. Pauli lost to Greuther Fürth 1–0. Lienen was critical of the referee after the match and was eventually fined €3,000. The club's next victory was a 2–0 win against Eintracht Braunschweig on 7 March 2015. St. Pauli defeated Fortuna Düsseldorf 4–0 on 6 April 2015. He has a record of four wins, three draws, and five losses since becoming head coach. He re-signed and moved to the technical director position for the 2017–18 season.

== Managerial record ==
As of 19 December 2016

Team	From	To	Record					
Team	From	To	M	W	D	L	Win %	Ref.
MSV Duisburg	22 March 1993	1 November 1994	65	25	14	26	38.46	
Hansa Rostock	1 July 1997	8 March 1999	60	18	18	24	30.00	
1. FC Köln	1 July 1999	28 January 2002	94	38	24	32	40.43	
Tenerife	1 July 2002	20 January 2003	20	3	13	4	15.00	
Borussia Mönchengladbach	1 March 2003	21 September 2003	18	7	5	6	38.89	
Hannover 96	8 March 2004	9 November 2005	63	22	17	24	34.92	
Panionios	15 June 2006	11 November 2008	92	37	20	35	40.22	
1860 Munich	13 May 2009	16 June 2010	39	15	8	16	38.46	
Olympiacos	16 June 2010	6 August 2010	4	3	0	1	75.00	
Arminia Bielefeld	8 November 2010	30 June 2011	23	3	7	13	13.04	
AEK Athens	10 October 2012	10 April 2013	24	8	5	11	33.33	
Oțelul Galați	6 November 2013	16 June 2014	22	8	3	11	36.36	
FC St. Pauli	16 December 2014	30 June 2017	71	25	16	30	35.21	
Total			595	212	150	233	35.63	—
