= Nicolas Marx =

French footballer (born 1974)

Personal information
- Date of birth: 26 February 1974 (age 52)
- Place of birth: Avignon, France
- Height: 1.80 m (5 ft 11 in)
- Position: Left winger

Senior career*
Years	Team	Apps	(Gls)
1992–2002	Nîmes	72+ (Note: Statistics are missing for the 1995–96 and 1996–97 seasons.)	(4+)
- * Club domestic league appearances and goals

Nicolas Marx (born 26 February 1974) is a French former professional footballer who played as a left winger. He spent his entire career at Nîmes.

== Personal life ==
Following his football career, Marx started to manage a brasserie. In 2015, it was revealed that he had gone traveling around the world.

== Honours ==
Nîmes

- Championnat National 1: 1996–97
- Coupe de France runner-up: 1995–96
