= Manny Fernandez =

Manny Fernandez may refer to:

- Emmanuel Fernandez (footballer) (born 2001), England-born Nigerian professional footballer
- Manny Fernandez (American football) (1946–2026), American football player
- Manny Fernandez (ice hockey) (born 1974), Canadian ice hockey goaltender
- Manny Fernandez (wrestler) (born 1954), American professional wrestler

== See also ==
- Manuel Fernandez (disambiguation)
- Manuel Fernandes (disambiguation)
