= Franck Touron =

French footballer and manager (born 1970)

Personal information
- Date of birth: 1 December 1970 (age 55)
- Place of birth: Valence, France
- Height: 1.74 m (5 ft 9 in)
- Position: Defender

Team information
- Current team: Paulhan-Pézenas (assistant)

Youth career
- 1987–1989: Nîmes

Senior career*
Years	Team	Apps	(Gls)
1989–1994	Nîmes	60	(2)
1994–1995	Grenoble		
1995–1997	Nîmes		

Managerial career
- 2011–: Paulhan-Pézenas (assistant)
- * Club domestic league appearances and goals

Franck Touron (born 1 December 1970) is a French football manager and former professional player who played as a defender. He spent most of his playing career at Nîmes. As of the 2021–22 season, he is an assistant manager at Départemental 2 club Paulhan-Pézenas.

== Honours ==
Nîmes

- Championnat National 1: 1996–97
- Coupe de France runner-up: 1995–96
