= Abder Ramdane =

French-Algerian footballer (born 1974)

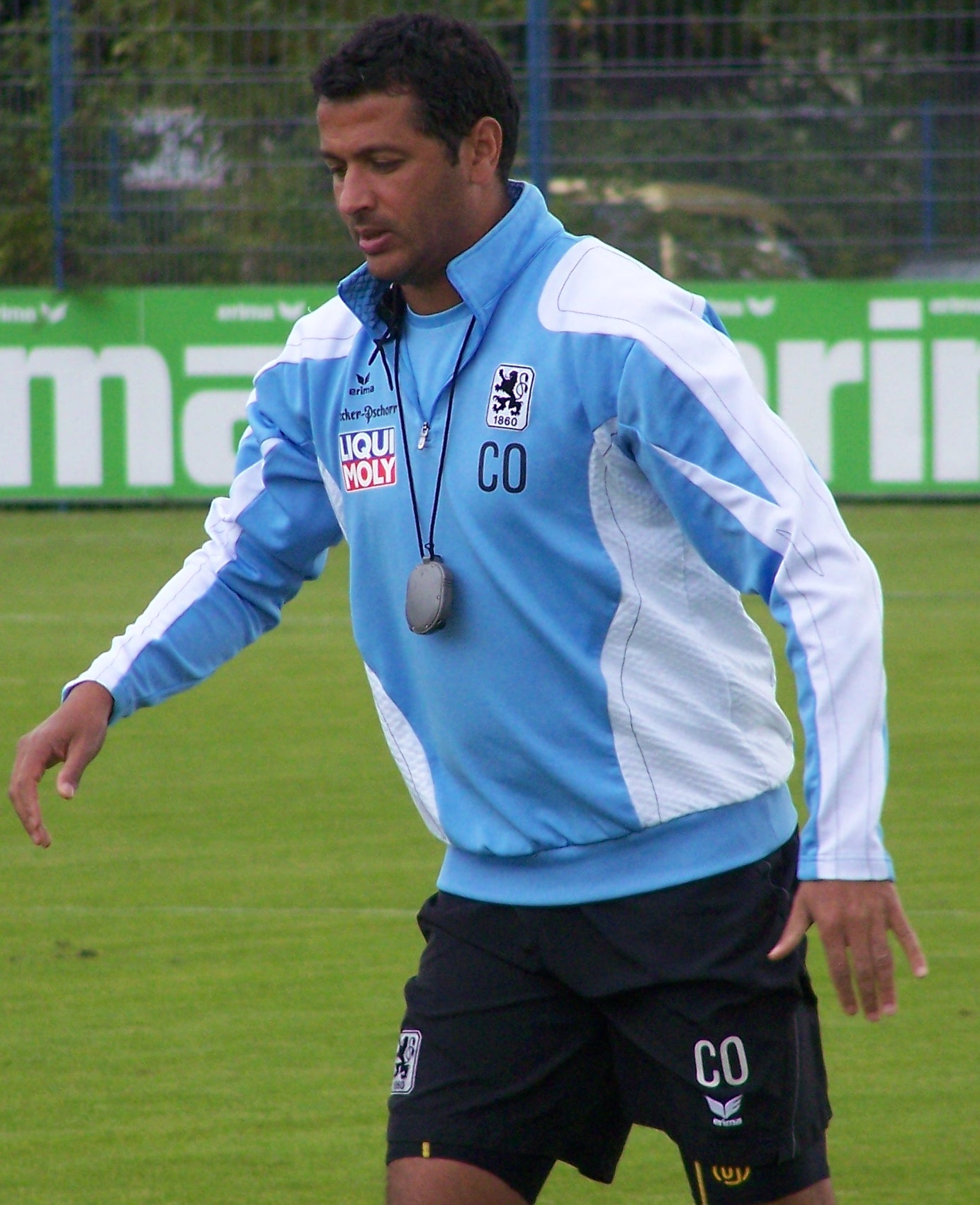
- Ramdane in 2009

Personal information
- Date of birth: 23 February 1974 (age 52)
- Place of birth: Nîmes, France
- Height: 1.79 m (5 ft 10 in)
- Position: Forward

Senior career*
Years	Team	Apps	(Gls)
1994–1996	Nîmes		
1996–1997	Le Havre		
1997–1998	Nîmes		
1998–1999	Hansa Rostock	21	(2)
1999–2005	SC Freiburg	91	(10)

Managerial career
- 2006–2008: Panionios (assistant)
- 2009–2010: 1860 Munich (assistant)
- 2010: Olympiacos (assistant)
- 2010–2011: Arminia Bielefeld (assistant)
- 2013–2014: Oțelul Galați (assistant)
- 2014–2017: FC St. Pauli (assistant)
- 2018–2019: Union SG (assistant)
- 2019–2020: Amiens SC (assistant)
- 2021–2028: Royal Charleroi (U18 manager)
- 2022–2023: Zébra Élites
- 2023–2024: JS Taminoise
- 2024–2025: Olympic Charleroi
- * Club domestic league appearances and goals

Abder Ramdane (born 23 February 1974) is a football manager,and former player who played as a forward.

== International career ==
Born in France, Ramdane chose to represent the Algeria national team, being selected for the squad for one match; however, he did not participate in the game.

== Coaching career ==
Ramdane was employed together with his father-in-law Ewald Lienen as assistant coach and U-19 coach by Greek club Panionios F.C., from 2006 until 2008. He held the same position previously at German side Borussia Mönchengladbach. They joined TSV 1860 Munich on 13 May 2009. In June 2010, both moved to Olympiacos where they stayed only for some weeks.

In November 2010, Lienen took over as coach of Arminia Bielefeld and Ramdane followed as assistant. Both left Bielefeld when they were relegated at the end of the season. In November 2013 he and Lienen were appointed by Romanian club Oțelul Galați as assistant coach and coach respectively.

In June 2018, Ramdane was appointed assistant coach to Luka Elsner at Belgian club Royale Union Saint-Gilloise. In the following year, he followed Elsner to French club Amiens SC. Ramdane left Armiens with Elsner at the end of September 2020.

After a year as U-18 coach at Royal Charleroi, it was confirmed in July 2022 that Ramdane would become manager of the club's reserve team, Zébra Élites. After a disappointing season where the team fought relegation, on March 6, 2023, the club decided to fire Ramdane and replace him with Frank Defays.

In July 2023, it became clear that Olympic Charleroi and JS Taminoise had entered into a cooperation agreement in relation to the clubs' academies, with Ramdane acting as managing director of the project. In November 2023, Ramdane even took over the helm of JS Taminoise. On February 7, 2024 Ramdane was appointed head coach of Olympic Charleroi.

== Honours ==
SC Freiburg

- 2. Bundesliga: 2002–03

Nîmes

- Coupe de France: finalist 1995–96
