= Christian Henna =

French footballer (born 1972)

Personal information
- Date of birth: 10 March 1972 (age 54)
- Place of birth: Mulhouse, France
- Height: 1.70 m (5 ft 7 in)
- Position: Midfielder

Senior career*
Years	Team	Apps	(Gls)
1988–1993	Mulhouse	42	(4)
1993–2000	Auxerre	52	(1)
Total		94	(5)
- * Club domestic league appearances and goals

Christian Henna (born 10 March 1972) is a French former professional footballer who played as a midfielder and spent several seasons in Ligue 1 for AJ Auxerre. (Note: Christian Henna – French league stats at LFP – also available in French (archived))
