= Christophe Zugna =

French footballer (born 1976)

Personal information
- Date of birth: 21 June 1976 (age 50)
- Place of birth: Arles, France
- Height: 1.81 m (5 ft 11 in)
- Position: Defender

Senior career*
Years	Team	Apps	(Gls)
1993–2002	Nîmes		
- * Club domestic league appearances and goals

Christophe Zugna (born 21 June 1976) is a French former professional footballer who played as a defender.
