= Manuel Fernandez (footballer) =

French-Spanish footballer (1922-1971)

Personal information
- Date of birth: 1 February 1922
- Place of birth: Lada, Spain
- Date of death: 9 January 1971 (aged 48)
- Place of death: France
- Position: Defender

Senior career*
Years	Team	Apps	(Gls)
- Lens
1946–1947	Clermont		
1947–1955	Saint-Étienne	230	(1)

Managerial career
- 1961–1962: Lyon
- * Club domestic league appearances and goals

Manuel "Manu" Fernandez (1 February 1922 – 9 January 1971) was a French-Spanish football defender who played for Lens, Clermont and Saint-Étienne and coached Lyon.
