= Omar Belbey =

Algerian footballer (born 1973)

Personal information
- Full name: Omar Cherif Belbey
- Date of birth: 7 October 1973 (age 53)
- Place of birth: Rouen, France
- Height: 1.74 m (5 ft 9 in)
- Position: Defensive midfielder

Senior career*
Years	Team	Apps	(Gls)
1993–1995	Rouen		
1995–2000	Nîmes		
2000–2002	Montpellier		
2003–2004	ES Wasquehal		

International career
2000–2002	Algeria	20	(0)
- * Club domestic league appearances and goals

Omar Cherif Belbey (born 7 October 1973) is a former professional footballer who played as a midfielder. Born in France, he represented Algeria at the 2002 African Cup of Nations in Mali.

In the final of the 1996 Coupe de France against AJ Auxerre, Belbey scored a goal for Nîmes Olympique.

== Honours ==
Nîmes

- Coupe de France runner-up: 1996 Coupe de France
- Championnat National: 1997
