= Franck Rabarivony =

Association football player (born 1970)

Personal information
- Full name: Ihaja Nirina Franck Rabarivony
- Date of birth: 15 November 1970 (age 55)
- Place of birth: Tours, France
- Height: 1.72 m (5 ft 8 in)
- Position: Defender

Senior career*
Years	Team	Apps	(Gls)
1987–1993	Auxerre B	103	(2)
1993–1998	Auxerre	113	(0)
1998–2001	Oviedo	79	(0)
2001–2002	Vitória de Guimarães	8	(0)
2002–2003	Skoda Xanthi	14	(1)
2003–2008	Stade Tamponnaise	-	(-)

International career
2003	Madagascar	1	(0)
- * Club domestic league appearances and goals

Franck Rabarivony (born 15 November 1970) is a former professional footballer who played as a defender.

Making his professional debut for Auxerre in 1993, he played for several clubs over a 21-year career, including Real Oviedo, Vitória de Guimarães, Skoda Xanthi and Stade Tamponnaise.

Born in France, he represented the Madagascar national team, earning his only cap on 11 November 2003 against Benin in a 2004 African Cup of Nations qualifying match.

== Honours ==
- Ligue 1: 1995–96
- Coupe de France: 1993–94, 1995–96
- UEFA Intertoto Cup: 1997
- Réunion Premier League: 2003–04, 2004–05, 2005–06, 2006–07
- Coupe de la Réunion: 2007–08
- Outremer Champions Cup: 2003–04, 2006–07
- Océan Indien Cup: 2003–04, 2005–06, 2006–07
