= Bernard Diomède =

French footballer (born 1974)

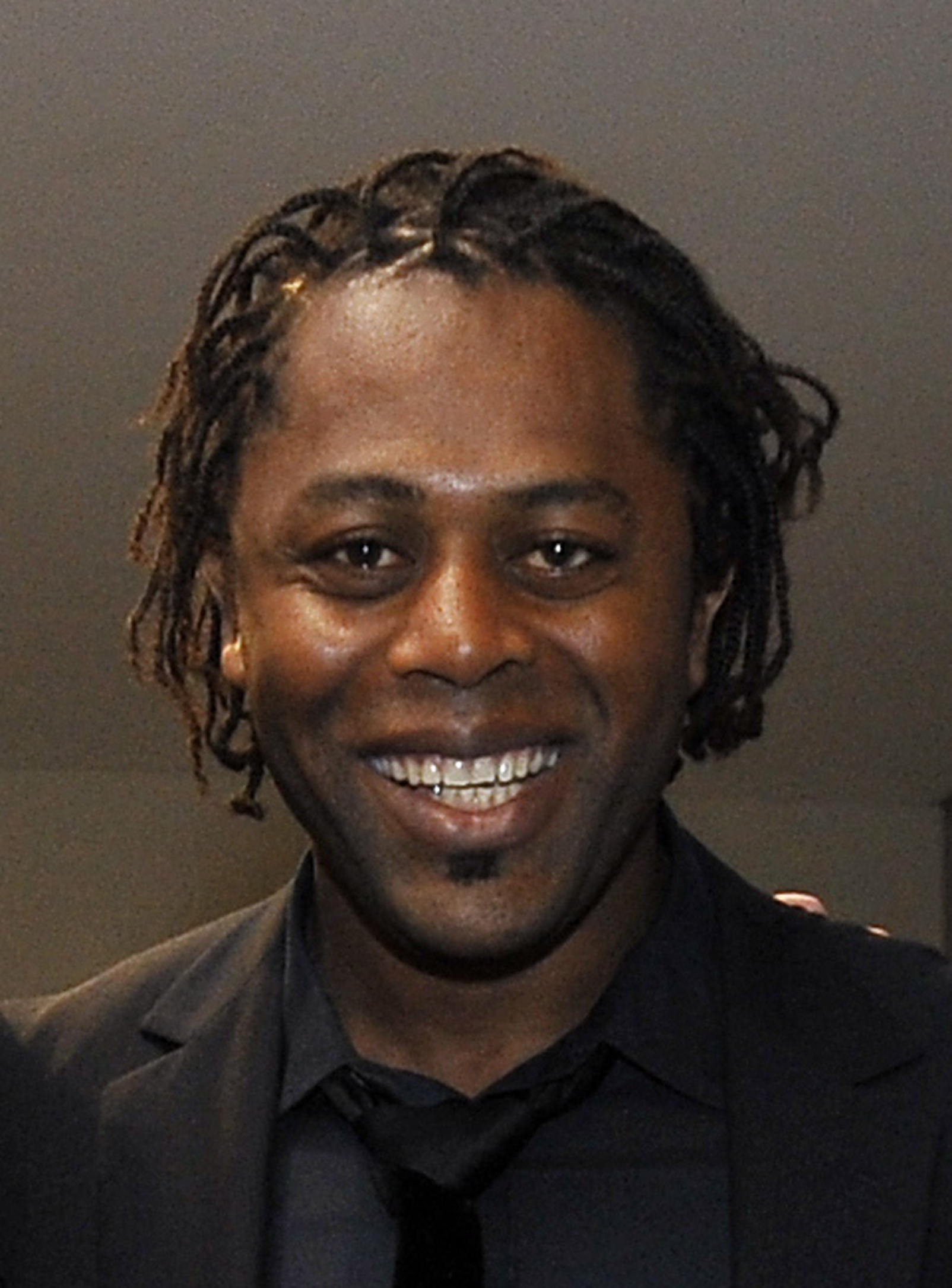
- Diomède in 2012

Personal information
- Full name: Bernard Nicolas Thierry Diomède
- Date of birth: 23 January 1974 (age 52)
- Place of birth: Saint-Doulchard, Cher, France
- Height: 1.75 m (5 ft 9 in)
- Position: Winger

Team information
- Current team: France U20 (manager)

Senior career*
Years	Team	Apps	(Gls)
1992–2000	Auxerre	176	(30)
2000–2003	Liverpool	2	(0)
2003	→ Ajaccio (loan)	15	(2)
2003–2004	Ajaccio	32	(7)
2005	Créteil	12	(4)
2006	Clermont Foot	11	(1)
Total		248	(44)

International career
1998	France	8	(0)

Managerial career
- 2015–2016: France U17
- 2016–2017: France U18
- 2017–2018: France U19
- 2018–2020: France U20
- 2020–2021: France U19
- 2021–2022: France U20
- 2022–2023: France U18
- 2023–2024: France U19
- 2024–: France U20
Medal record
Men's football
Representing France (as player)
FIFA World Cup
Winner	1998 France
Representing France (as manager)
UEFA European Under-19 Championship
Runner-up	2024 Northern Ireland
- * Club domestic league appearances and goals

Bernard Nicolas Thierry Diomède (born 23 January 1974) is a French football manager and former professional player. He is currently the manager of the France U20s. He played as a winger and won the World Cup with France in 1998.

== Early life ==
Diomède was born in Saint-Doulchard, Cher, to parents of Guadeloupean descent.

== Club career ==
Diomède's career began with Auxerre. After playing at youth level for the club, he made his Division 1 debut in 1992. He played in the first team for eight years, under Guy Roux Auxerre won the Division 1 and Coupe de France double in 1996. The winger scored 30 goals in 175 Ligue 1 matches for Auxerre.

In June 2000, Diomède was signed for £3m by then Liverpool manager Gérard Houllier. Making his debut against Sunderland, Diomède appeared to have scored with an overhead kick, but the goal was not given even though replays showed that the ball had crossed the line. However, he did not settle in England, and only played five matches for Liverpool. In January 2003, he was loaned out to Ajaccio, newly promoted in France's Ligue 1, until the end of his contract. After his spell at Liverpool had come to an end, he joined the Ligue 2 team Créteil, and then Clermont Foot in the Championnat National (3rd division).

== International career ==
Diomède was capped eight times for the France national team, but never scored. He received his first cap in a friendly against Spain on 28 January 1998. At the 1998 World Cup he started in three matches, against Saudi Arabia and Denmark in the group stage and against Paraguay in the round of 16. He was unable to regain his place in the France national team after the 1998 World Cup.

== Retirement ==
On 18 January 2008, Diomède announced his retirement from the game after being without a club for 18 months.

He now runs the Bernard Diomede Football Academy at the Saint Nicolas high school in Issy-les-Moulineaux, just south of Paris.

== Honours ==
=== Player ===
Auxerre

- Division 1: 1995–96
- Coupe de France: 1995–96

France

- FIFA World Cup: 1998

Orders

- Knight of the Legion of Honour: 1998
- Officer of the National Order of Merit: 2013

=== Managerial ===
France U19

- UEFA European Under-19 Championship runner-up: 2024
