= Lilian Laslandes =

French footballer (born 1971)

Personal information
- Date of birth: 4 September 1971 (age 55)
- Place of birth: Pauillac, France
- Height: 1.86 m (6 ft 1 in)
- Position: Forward

Senior career*
Years	Team	Apps	(Gls)
1991–1992	Saint-Seurin	33	(10)
1992–1997	Auxerre	125	(47)
1997–2001	Bordeaux	119	(47)
2001–2003	Sunderland	12	(0)
2002	→ 1. FC Köln (loan)	5	(0)
2002–2003	→ Bastia (loan)	29	(8)
2003–2004	Nice	33	(10)
2004–2007	Bordeaux	59	(10)
2007–2008	Nice	40	(5)
Total		455	(137)

International career
1993	France U21	1	(0)
1997–1999	France	7	(3)
- * Club domestic league appearances and goals

Lilian Laslandes (French pronunciation: [liljɑ̃ lɑsˈlɑ̃d]; born 4 September 1971) is a French former professional footballer who played as a forward. Between 1997 and 1999 he was capped seven times and scored three goals for the France national team. He ended his professional footballing career at OGC Nice in 2008.

== Career ==
=== Early career ===
Laslandes was born in Pauillac, Gironde. He started his professional career at the rather late age of 20, starting at the club Saint-Seurin in which he scored 10 goals in his 33 appearances for the club. AJ Auxerre took notice of his talent and acquired him following the season. He went on to make 125 appearances for the club, 20 of them in European competitions, scoring 47 goals including two in European cup ties.

Laslandes then moved to Girondins de Bordeaux on a free transfer on 1 August 1997 scoring 47 goals in 119 appearances. Foreign clubs were starting to take notice of the Frenchman and his consistent goalscoring ability, including some from England, Germany and Spain.

=== Sunderland ===
Laslandes arrived in June 2001, as Peter Reid's replacement for the ageing Niall Quinn. Much media hype surrounded the powerful Frenchman as the club paid £3.6 million for his signature, but he struggled to adapt to the pace of the English Premiership and Sunderland's style of direct football. Laslandes' relationship with Reid had also deteriorated. After 12 appearances with no league goals and one in the League Cup against Sheffield Wednesday, Laslandes went on loan in January 2002 to German club 1. FC Köln, where he played five matches without scoring, which earned him the derogatory nickname "LasLandesliga". This was followed by a more successful loan to French first division club Bastia for the 2002–03 season, where he scored eight goals in 30 appearances.

Laslandes returned briefly to Sunderland in the summer of 2003 for pre-season training with new manager Mick McCarthy. However, all parties agreed he had no future at Sunderland. Despite chairman Bob Murray's efforts to secure a transfer fee for the former French international, Sunderland's crippling debts, combined with Laslandes' high wages, put Murray in a weak bargaining position, with the result that Laslandes was released from his contract and joined French first division club OGC Nice at the start of the 2003–04 season.

=== Back at Bordeaux ===
At the beginning of the 2004–05 season, Bordeaux brought the striker back to the club where he had earlier found glory, but he never found his old form, scoring only nine goals in 53 appearances.

=== Back at Nice ===
On 5 January 2007, Laslandes signed for his former club Nice for an undisclosed fee. He was released in the summer of 2008. He then decided to retire from professional football and become a handball player for Girondins de Bordeaux instead.

== Career statistics ==
=== Club ===
Appearances and goals by club, season and competition
Club	Season	League			Cup (Note: Includes Coupe de France, Coupe de la Ligue, EFL Cup and DFB-Pokal.)		Continental (Note: Includes UEFA Champions League, UEFA Cup, UEFA Intertoto Cup and UEFA Cup Winners' Cup.)		Total	
Club	Season	Division	Apps	Goals	Apps	Goals	Apps	Goals	Apps	Goals
Auxerre	1992–93	Division 1	19	9	1	0	4	1	24	10
Auxerre	1993–94	Division 1	19	5	2	1	1	0	22	6
Auxerre	1994–95	Division 1	26	11	2	0	6	0	34	11
Auxerre	1995–96	Division 1	34	12	6	3	–		40	15
Auxerre	1996–97	Division 1	27	10	4	2	5	1	36	13
Auxerre	Total		125	47	15	6	16	2	156	55
Bordeaux	1997–98	Division 1	33	14	7	2	2	0	42	16
Bordeaux	1998–99	Division 1	33	15	2	0	8	0	43	15
Bordeaux	1999–00	Division 1	31	14	6	4	10	1	47	19
Bordeaux	2000–01	Division 1	22	4	1	0	8	4	31	8
Bordeaux	Total		119	47	16	6	28	5	163	58
Sunderland	2001–02	Premier League	12	0	1	1	–		13	1
1. FC Köln (loan)	2001–02	Bundesliga	5	0	2	0	–		7	0
Bastia (loan)	2002–03	Ligue 1	29	8	2	0	–		31	8
Nice	2003–04	Ligue 1	33	10	2	0	3	0	38	10
Bordeaux	2004–05	Ligue 1	21	6	2	1	–		23	7
Bordeaux	2005–06	Ligue 1	28	3	4	2	–		32	5
Bordeaux	2006–07	Ligue 1	10	1	1	0	5	1	16	2
Bordeaux	Total		59	10	7	3	5	1	71	14
Nice	2006–07	Ligue 1	16	3	1	0	–		17	3
Nice	2007–08	Ligue 1	24	2	3	0	–		27	2
Nice	Total		40	5	4	0	-	-	44	5
Career total			422	127	49	16	52	8	523	151

=== International ===
Appearances and goals by national team and year
National team	Year	Apps	Goals
France	1997	1	0
France	1998	2	1
France	1999	4	2
Total		7	3

France score listed first, score column indicates score after each Laslandes goal.

List of international goals scored by Lilian Laslandes
No.	Date	Venue	Cap	Opponent	Score	Result	Competition	Ref.
1	19 August 1998	Ernst-Happel-Stadion, Vienna, Austria	2	Austria	1–0	2–2	Friendly	
2	18 August 1999	Windsor Park, Belfast, Northern Ireland	4	Northern Ireland	1–0	1–0	Friendly	
3	8 September 1999	Hrazdan Stadium, Yerevan, Armenia	6	Armenia	3–1	3–2	UEFA Euro 2000 qualification	

== Honours ==
Auxerre

- Division 1: 1995–96
- Coupe de France: 1993–94, 1995–96

Bordeaux

- Division 1: 1998–99
- Coupe de la Ligue runner-up: 1997–98
