= Laurent Blanc =

French football manager and former player (born 1965)

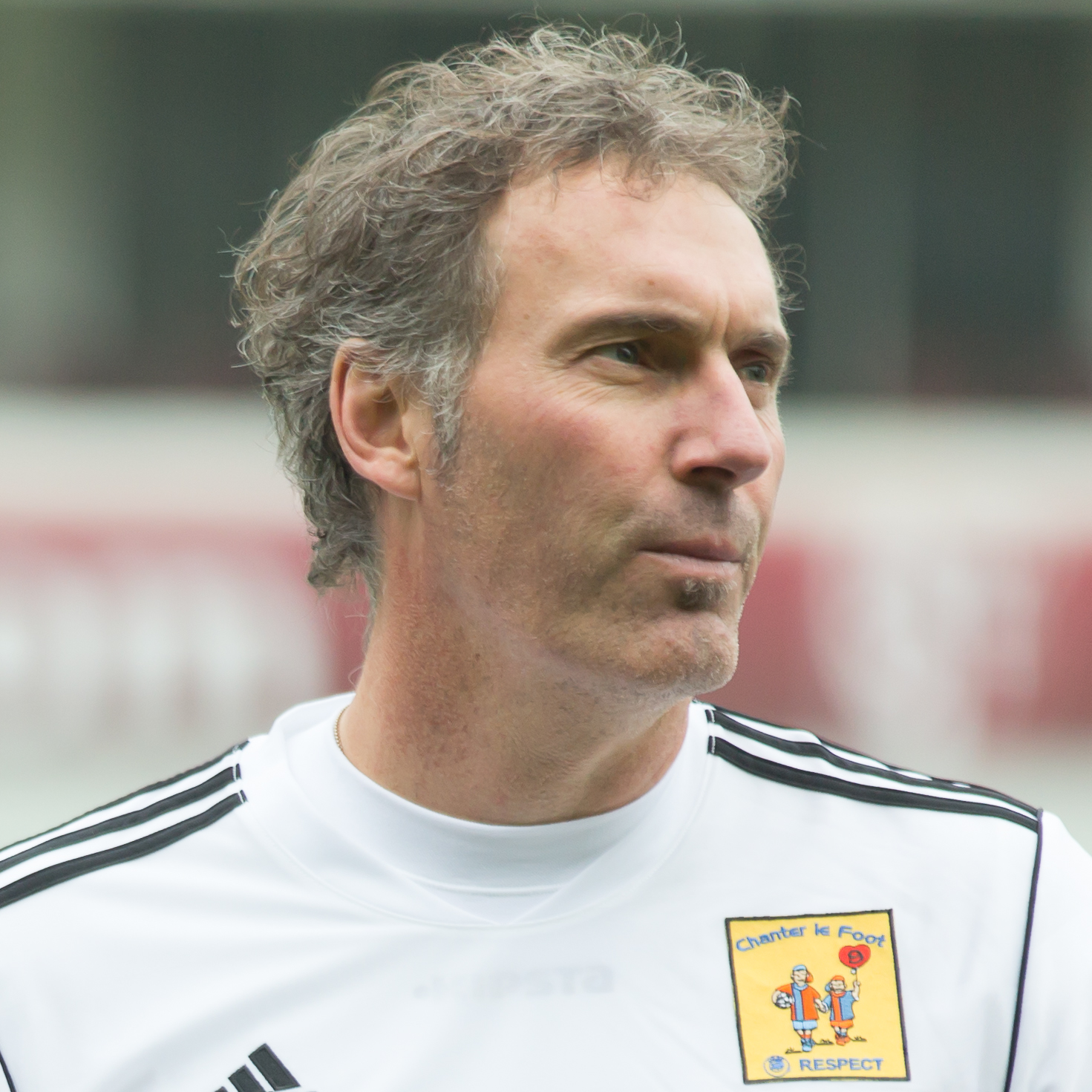
- Blanc in 2013

Personal information
- Full name: Laurent Robert Blanc
- Date of birth: 19 November 1965 (age 61)
- Place of birth: Alès, France
- Height: 1.92 m (6 ft 4 in)
- Position: Centre-back

Youth career
- 1976–1978: AS Rousson
- 1978–1980: Olympique Alès
- 1980–1983: Montpellier

Senior career*
| Years | Team | Apps | (Gls) |
| 1983–1991 | Montpellier | 243 | (76) |
| 1991–1992 | Napoli | 31 | (6) |
| 1992–1993 | Nîmes | 29 | (1) |
| 1993–1995 | Saint-Étienne | 70 | (18) |
| 1995–1996 | Auxerre | 23 | (2) |
| 1996–1997 | Barcelona | 28 | (1) |
| 1997–1999 | Marseille | 63 | (14) |
| 1999–2001 | Inter Milan | 67 | (6) |
| 2001–2003 | Manchester United | 48 | (1) |
| Total | | 602 | (125) |

International career
| 1989–2000 | France | 97 | (16) |

Managerial career
- 2007–2010: Bordeaux
- 2010–2012: France
- 2013–2016: Paris Saint-Germain
- 2020–2022: Al-Rayyan
- 2022–2023: Lyon
- 2024–2025: Al-Ittihad
Medal record
Men's football
Representing France
FIFA World Cup
| Winner | 1998 |
UEFA European Championship
| Winner | 2000 |
UEFA European Under-21 Championship
| Winner | 1988 |
- * Club domestic league appearances and goals

Laurent Robert Blanc (French pronunciation: [lɔʁɑ̃ blɑ̃]; born 19 November 1965) is a French professional football manager and former player who played as a centre-back. He last managed Saudi Pro League club Al-Ittihad. He has the nickname Le Président, which was given to him following his stint at Marseille in tribute to his leadership skills. He is widely regarded as one of the greatest defenders of all time.

Blanc played professional football for numerous clubs, including Montpellier, Napoli, Barcelona, Marseille, Inter Milan and Manchester United, often operating in the sweeper position. He is also a former French international, earning 97 caps and scoring 16 international goals. He represented the country in several international tournaments, including the 1998 FIFA World Cup and UEFA Euro 2000, both of which France won. On 28 June 1998, Blanc scored the first golden goal in World Cup history against Paraguay.

He began his managerial career at Bordeaux in 2007, winning domestic honours including the 2008–09 Ligue 1 title. After leaving Bordeaux in 2010 he became the manager of the France national team until 2012, replacing Raymond Domenech in the wake of a disastrous 2010 FIFA World Cup performance and leading the country to the quarter-finals of UEFA Euro 2012. In 2013, he was hired by Paris Saint-Germain, where he would win eleven trophies, including two domestic doubles. After three successful years with Paris Saint-Germain he left the club in June 2016, and was hired Al-Rayyan in 2020. Following more than six years without coaching in Europe, he was appointed manager by Lyon in October 2022, but he was sacked the following year and in 2024 became the manager of Al-Ittihad.

== Club career ==
=== Early years ===
Blanc was born in Alès, Gard, France. His career started at Montpellier, where he signed his first professional contract in 1983. A very technical, yet slow player, he played as an attacking midfielder and helped the club get promoted to Division 1 in 1987. Only a few years later did he settle as a defender following the advice from Michel Mézy, a position in which his physical stature (1.92 m, 86 kg) and his temperament would prove invaluable. His game being perfectly fitted for the French league, he managed to score at least 12 Division 1 goals per season in his last three seasons at Montpellier, for the most part penalties and headers. He also won the Coupe de France in 1990, scoring a goal in the final match. Blanc remains Montpellier's all-time leading goal scorer, with 83 in all competitions (76 altogether in Division 1 and Division 2). On 5 August 2017, Souleymane Camara scored the only goal (in the 59th minute) in Montpellier's Matchday 1 Ligue 1 1–0 win against Caen to register his 48th Ligue 1 goal for Montpellier, breaking Blanc's longstanding Montpellier record of 47 Division 1 goals scored in four seasons.

In 1991, Blanc tried his luck abroad when he left Montpellier for Napoli in the Italian Serie A. Despite a decent season, during which he managed to score six goals, he felt like he could not fully express his potential and returned to France after just one year, to Nîmes and then Saint Étienne, where again he imposed himself as one of the best defenders in the league. Although Blanc scored 13 goals in his last season at Saint-Étienne, les Verts were almost relegated, only staying up because Marseille were not allowed to return to the first division because of the club's financial difficulties. Guy Roux, impressed by Blanc and looking for a replacement for Dutch international Frank Verlaat, convinced him to join Auxerre in 1995. Despite injuring himself early in the season, Blanc came back strongly and played a great part in the team's double that year.

=== Barcelona ===
Blanc's success at Auxerre drew the attention of several big European clubs. Blanc agreed to join Barcelona in Spain largely because manager Johan Cruyff wanted him and persuaded him to sign. But on the very day that Blanc said yes to Barça, Cruyff was sacked, and Blanc's spell with the club was a less than happy one. Blanc was in the side when Barcelona won the Supercopa de España against Atlético Madrid, but was injured soon afterwards. He played regularly upon his return from injury, but was sent off during the Cup Winners' Cup quarter-final against AIK. He then injured himself again against Extremadura, which forced him to miss the Clásico and the Cup Winners' Cup final against Paris Saint-Germain. After this disappointing season and only one year away from the 1998 World Cup, he decided to leave.

=== "Le Président" ===
Rolland Courbis managed to convince Blanc to join Marseille, which proved beneficial for both the club and Blanc. Blanc quickly became a leader in a team that was desperately lacking confidence, and helped Marseille finish in fourth place in his first season, during which he scored 11 goals and earned the nickname "Le Président" ("The President"). The season following the World Cup was both successful and frustrating for Blanc and Marseille, as they finished runners-up in the championship, only one point shy of Bordeaux, and reached the UEFA Cup final, only to lose 3–0 to Parma, with Hernán Crespo intercepting Blanc's back pass to Stéphane Porato to score the opener. Afterwards, Blanc left Marseille for Inter Milan, where he enjoyed some success, winning the Pirata d'Oro (Inter Player of the Year) in 2000.

=== Manchester United ===
Manchester United manager Alex Ferguson had attempted to lure Blanc several times since 1996 and finally succeeded in August 2001 when, at the age of 35, Blanc was brought in to replace the departing Jaap Stam. He was criticised for poor performances in the early months of his stay at Old Trafford, when United suffered five defeats in the league by 1 December 2001 – with some critics even being keen to point out that the five teams who had beaten them in the league began with the letters which spelt out Blanc's surname – Bolton Wanderers, Liverpool, Arsenal, Newcastle United, and Chelsea. He initially arrived at Old Trafford on a one-year contract, and as his form and his team's form improved throughout the season (although it wasn't enough for United to catch Arsenal in the title race or advance beyond Bayer Leverkusen in the Champions League semis), he was eventually awarded a fresh one-year contract to give him a second season in Manchester. He was nicknamed "Larry White" by fans as a loose translation of his name.

He scored four goals during his time at Manchester United. One of these came in the league against Tottenham Hotspur, and the other three all came in the Champions League in games against Olympiacos and Boavista (both home and away). Blanc retired from football after helping United win the 2002–03 FA Premier League title.

== International career ==
Blanc won the 1988 UEFA European Under-21 Championship, his team beating Greece in the final. He was named the tournament's Golden Player by UEFA.

On 7 February 1989, Blanc made his debut for the senior national team against the Republic of Ireland. France, then in reconstruction after the retirement of numerous key players, did not manage to qualify for the 1990 FIFA World Cup. Shortly after that, they started an impressive 19-game unbeaten streak, including eight wins out of eight in Euro 1992 qualifying, making them one of the favorites to win the competition. They would, however, get knocked out in the group stage by eventual winners Denmark.

After France failed to qualify for the 1994 FIFA World Cup, Blanc was heavily criticised, as well the rest of the team, and he subsequently decided to retire from international football. Aimé Jacquet, after taking over the managerial position of the national team, made it one of his priorities to convince Blanc to change his mind. Blanc returned to the team for the Euro 1996 qualification campaign and scored in a 4–0 win over Slovakia. At the tournament finals, he formed a central defensive partnership with Marcel Desailly. Blanc scored France's opening goal in the final group match against Bulgaria in a 3–1 win to put the team into the quarter-finals, where they faced the Netherlands at Anfield. Blanc scored France's winning penalty kick in the shootout after the match had ended 0–0. France then lost on penalty kicks at the semi-final stage after drawing 0–0 with the Czech Republic. However, Blanc again successfully converted his kick.

France then entered the 1998 FIFA World Cup, which was held on home soil. Blanc was exemplary during the competition and, on 28 June 1998, scored the first-ever golden goal in World Cup history against Paraguay in the round of 16. In the quarter-final, Blanc helped France to a clean sheet over Italy and scored the winning penalty as Les Bleus prevailed in the shootout. He missed the final after being sent off in the semi-final against Croatia for slapping Slaven Bilić. The sending off was the first (and only) red card of Blanc's international professional career. Despite Blanc's absence, France lifted the World Cup for the first time after defeating Brazil 3–0 at the Stade de France.

Blanc was also part of the team that won UEFA Euro 2000 during which, despite having been criticised for his age and lack of speed during the qualifications, he proved reliable in defence and even scored France's first goal of the tournament against Denmark in the group stage. He announced his retirement from international football after the competition, following the example of his captain Didier Deschamps. On 2 September 2000, Blanc, along with Deschamps and Bernard Lama, played his final match for Les Bleus in a friendly against England at the Stade de France.

Blanc was well known for kissing good friend and goalkeeper Fabien Barthez's head before the start of every match, supposedly for good luck (the two did repeat this ritual when they played together for Manchester United, but only for Champions League matches). The France national team was unbeaten in all matches when it fielded the World Cup and European Championship winning defence of Blanc, Desailly, Lilian Thuram and Bixente Lizarazu. Overall, Blanc recorded 97 caps and scored 16 goals. In 1999, the readers of France Football magazine voted him the fourth-best French player of all time, behind Michel Platini, Zinedine Zidane and Raymond Kopa.

== Managerial career ==
=== Bordeaux ===
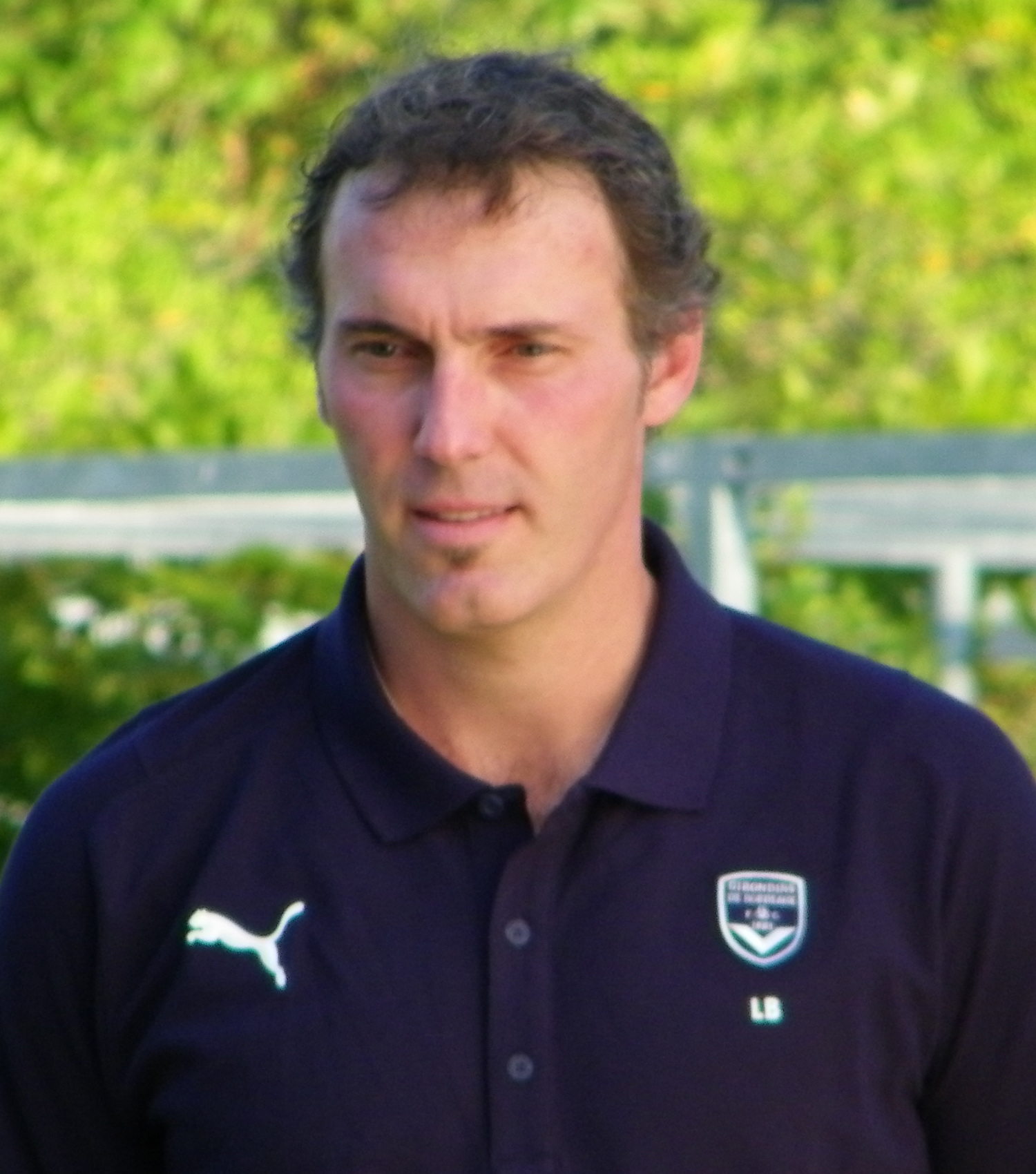
Blanc during his time with Bordeaux in 2009

On 8 June 2007, Blanc was named the new manager of Bordeaux, replacing Brazilian Ricardo Gomes. For his first season on the bench, he led the club to second place in Ligue 1 and won the Manager of the Year award. His second Ligue 1 season was extremely successful. Bordeaux won the final 11 league matches of the 2008–09 Ligue 1 season, setting a new French record for consecutive wins, to clinch the Ligue 1 title three points clear of Olympique de Marseille. Bordeaux also won the 2008–09 Coupe de la Ligue. Blanc was again nominated for Manager of the Year but lost to Marseille manager Eric Gerets.

In the 2009–10 Champions League campaign, Blanc's Bordeaux topped a group featuring Juventus and Bayern Munich without losing a match. After defeating Olympiacos in the Round of 16, they were eliminated by fellow French side Lyon in the quarter-finals.

=== France ===
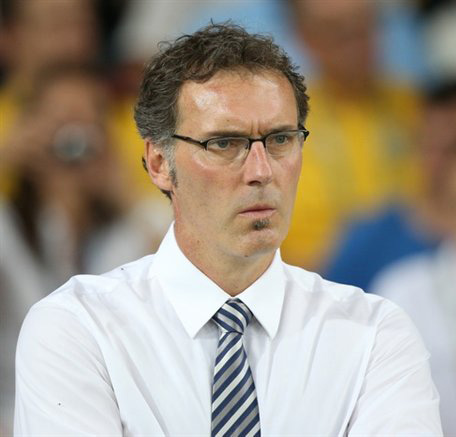
Blanc managing France at UEFA Euro 2012

On 16 May 2010, Blanc confirmed his departure from Bordeaux after three seasons in charge of the French outfit. After resigning from his position, Blanc contacted the French Football Federation (FFF) to inquire about the France national team job, which was eventually vacated by Raymond Domenech following the 2010 World Cup. Later that day, FFF President Jean-Pierre Escalettes confirmed that Blanc was a candidate for the position. On 18 May 2010, with Blanc's appointment to the position becoming more probable, Bordeaux chairman Jean-Louis Triaud demanded compensation from the Federation. On 20 May 2010, the club reached an agreement with the FFF for €1.5 million. On 26 June, French media confirmed that Blanc had signed a two-year contract with the Federation to lead the team to Euro 2012. The deal was finalised a week later and Blanc was officially named as manager of the team on 2 July.

As he took charge of France, the Federation had decided to suspend all 23 players who took part in the South African World Cup, much to Blanc's regret. On 11 August, in his first game as manager, France lost 2–1 to Norway at the Ullevaal Stadion in Oslo. However, Blanc's team soon managed to top their Euro 2012 qualifying group while also achieving friendly wins over England, Brazil and Germany. France's first match in Group D of Euro 2012 was against England and ended in a 1–1 draw, after Samir Nasri scored to cancel out a goal scored by Joleon Lescott. France then went on to win their second match 2–0 against Ukraine. They advanced to the quarter-finals by finishing in second position in Group D, despite losing to Sweden 2–0 in their final group match. France were defeated 2–0 by the defending champions Spain in the quarter-final match. Blanc stepped down as manager of the national team on 30 June 2012 and was replaced by former France captain and teammate Didier Deschamps.

=== Paris Saint-Germain ===
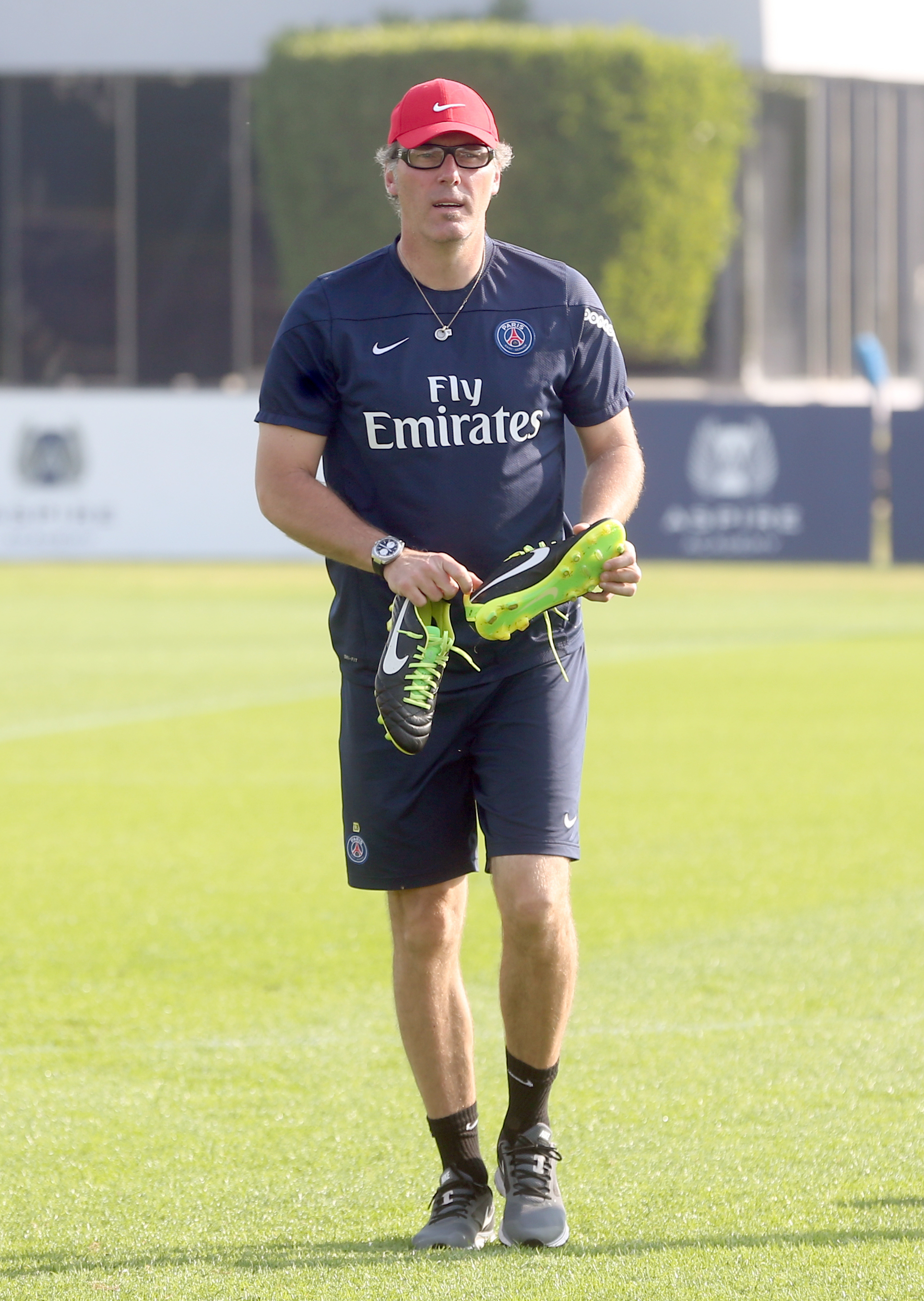
Blanc at Paris Saint-Germain's December 2013 training camp in Doha, Qatar

Blanc was appointed manager of Paris Saint-Germain on 25 June 2013 shortly after previous manager Carlo Ancelotti left for Real Madrid. On 3 August, Blanc won his first trophy with the club, the 2013 Trophée des Champions, defeating Bordeaux 2–1 in the Stade d'Angondjé in Libreville, Gabon, coming from behind with late goals from Hervin Ongenda and Alex. A second item of silverware was won on 19 April 2014, as two goals from Edinson Cavani defeated Lyon 2–1 in the 2014 Coupe de la Ligue Final. PSG's European campaign ended in the quarter-finals of the 2013–14 UEFA Champions League with elimination by Chelsea on away goals. On 7 May 2014, after nearest rivals Monaco drew with Guingamp, PSG won the league, despite losing to Rennes later that day in the match in which they celebrated their triumph. The following day, Blanc was given a one-year contract extension to 2016, with club president Nasser Al-Khelaifi saying: "We are very happy with his results this season, as well as the very attractive football the team has played. We are convinced we will win a lot more trophies together."

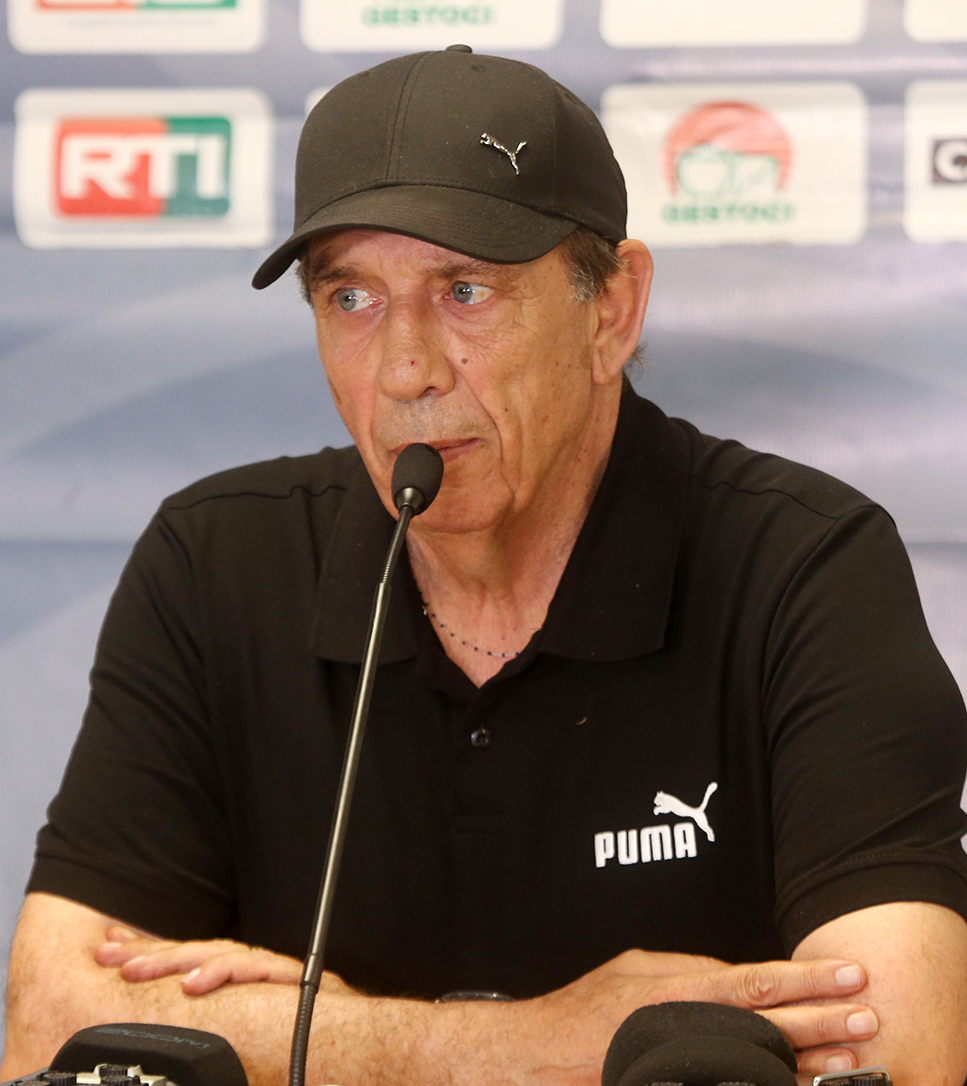
Jean-Louis Gasset, his assistant from 2007 to 2016, conducts the training sessions

Blanc's second season in charge began with victory in the 2014 Trophée des Champions against Guingamp at the Workers' Stadium in Beijing. On 11 April 2015, PSG retained the Coupe de la Ligue with a victory over Bastia in the final, with Edinson Cavani and Zlatan Ibrahimović scoring two goals each in a 4–0 victory. PSG won the Ligue 1 title for the third consecutive year on 16 May 2015 with a 2–1 victory at Montpellier. On 11 February 2016, Blanc signed a two-year contract extension. PSG reached the quarter-finals of the Champions League for the fourth consecutive year after dispatching Chelsea in the round of 16, but lost to Manchester City in the quarter-finals. Blanc was criticised by the French media after the Champions League quarterfinal second-leg match against Manchester City, where he had surprised many by having his team play in an untried 5–3–2 formation that backfired completely. On 21 May 2016, PSG defeated Marseille 4–2 in the 2016 Coupe de France Final. PSG thus won the Ligue 1–Coupe de France–Coupe de la Ligue domestic treble for the second consecutive season and equalled Marseille's all-time record of ten Coupe de France titles. On 3 June 2016, when asked for his assessment of the season during an interview given to the newspaper Le Parisien, PSG's president, Nasser Al-Khelaifi described the 2015–2016 season as a failure because of PSG's elimination from the Champions League by Manchester City at the quarter-final stage, and stated that changes would be made before the following season and a new cycle would begin. On 27 June 2016, PSG announced that Blanc and assistant coach Jean-Louis Gasset had left the club by mutual agreement that "preserved the interests of both parties", noting that Blanc had "left a significant mark on the great history of Paris Saint-Germain". The French sports daily L'Équipe reported that Blanc would receive a severance deal worth 22 million euros.

=== Al-Rayyan ===
On 19 December 2020, Blanc was appointed as the head coach of Qatari club Al-Rayyan, replacing Uruguayan Diego Aguirre. On 13 February 2022, he was terminated because of poor results and replaced by Nicolás Córdova.

=== Lyon ===
On 9 October 2022, Blanc was appointed as the manager of French club Lyon. He replaced outgoing Dutch manager Peter Bosz. He was sacked by OL on 8 September 2023, after losing three of their four opening games, leaving them in last place. Blanc averaged 1.53 points per game, the second worst score of any permanent Lyon manager in the previous 25 years.

=== Al-Ittihad ===
On 13 July 2024, Blanc was appointed as the head coach of Saudi Pro League club Al-Ittihad, replacing Argentine Marcelo Gallardo. In his first season in charge, Blanc led the team to a domestic double, winning the Saudi Pro League and the King's Cup. On 28 September 2025, he was relieved of his duties early in the following season after a 2–0 home defeat against Al-Nassr, despite this being their first loss of the season.

== Career statistics ==
=== Club ===
Appearances and goals by club, season and competition
| Club | Season | League | | | Cup (Note: Appearances in League Cup, Supercopa de España) | | Europe (Note: Appearances in UEFA Champions League, Intercontinental Cup) | | Total | |
| Club | Season | Division | Apps | Goals | Apps | Goals | Apps | Goals | Apps | Goals |
|---|---|---|---|---|---|---|---|---|---|---|
| Montpellier | 1983–84 | Division 2 | 15 | 0 | 0 | 0 | — | | 15 | 0 |
| Montpellier | 1984–85 | Division 2 | 32 | 5 | 1 | 0 | — | | 33 | 5 |
| Montpellier | 1985–86 | Division 2 | 29 | 6 | 2 | 0 | — | | 31 | 6 |
| Montpellier | 1986–87 | Division 2 | 34 | 18 | 1 | 0 | — | | 35 | 18 |
| Montpellier | 1987–88 | Division 1 | 24 | 6 | 1 | 0 | — | | 25 | 6 |
| Montpellier | 1988–89 | Division 1 | 35 | 15 | 3 | 1 | 2 | 0 | 40 | 16 |
| Montpellier | 1989–90 | Division 1 | 36 | 12 | 6 | 2 | — | | 42 | 14 |
| Montpellier | 1990–91 | Division 1 | 38 | 14 | 2 | 0 | 6 | 1 | 46 | 15 |
| Montpellier | Total | | 243 | 76 | 16 | 3 | 8 | 1 | 267 | 80 |
| Napoli | 1991–92 | Serie A | 31 | 6 | 3 | 0 | — | | 34 | 6 |
| Nîmes | 1992–93 | Division 1 | 29 | 1 | 1 | 0 | — | | 30 | 1 |
| Saint-Étienne | 1993–94 | Division 1 | 33 | 5 | 1 | 0 | — | | 34 | 5 |
| Saint-Étienne | 1994–95 | Division 1 | 37 | 13 | 2 | 0 | — | | 39 | 13 |
| Saint-Étienne | Total | | 70 | 18 | 3 | 0 | 0 | 0 | 73 | 18 |
| Auxerre | 1995–96 | Division 1 | 23 | 2 | 8 | 2 | — | | 31 | 4 |
| Barcelona | 1996–97 | La Liga | 28 | 1 | 5 | 0 | 5 | 0 | 38 | 1 |
| Marseille | 1997–98 | Division 1 | 31 | 11 | 4 | 2 | — | | 35 | 13 |
| Marseille | 1998–99 | Division 1 | 32 | 3 | 2 | 0 | 10 | 1 | 44 | 4 |
| Marseille | Total | | 63 | 14 | 6 | 2 | 10 | 1 | 79 | 17 |
| Inter Milan | 1999–2000 | Serie A | 34 | 3 | 7 | 0 | — | | 41 | 3 |
| Inter Milan | 2000–01 | Serie A | 33 | 3 | 2 | 0 | 9 | 0 | 44 | 3 |
| Inter Milan | Total | | 67 | 6 | 9 | 0 | 9 | 0 | 85 | 6 |
| Manchester United | 2001–02 | Premier League | 29 | 1 | 2 | 0 | 15 | 2 | 46 | 3 |
| Manchester United | 2002–03 | Premier League | 19 | 0 | 1 | 0 | 9 | 1 | 29 | 1 |
| Manchester United | Total | | 48 | 1 | 3 | 0 | 24 | 3 | 75 | 4 |
| Career total | | | 602 | 125 | 54 | 7 | 56 | 5 | 712 | 137 |

=== International ===
Appearances and goals by national team and year
| National team | Year | Apps | Goals |
|---|---|---|---|
| France | 1989 | 6 | 1 |
| France | 1990 | 7 | 1 |
| France | 1991 | 6 | 2 |
| France | 1992 | 8 | 0 |
| France | 1993 | 8 | 3 |
| France | 1994 | 7 | 0 |
| France | 1995 | 4 | 1 |
| France | 1996 | 10 | 3 |
| France | 1997 | 7 | 0 |
| France | 1998 | 13 | 3 |
| France | 1999 | 9 | 0 |
| France | 2000 | 12 | 2 |
| Total | | 97 | 16 |

Scores and results list France's goal tally first, score column indicates score after each Blanc goal.

List of international goals scored by Laurent Blanc
| No. | Date | Venue | Opponent | Score | Result | Competition | Ref. |
|---|---|---|---|---|---|---|---|
| 1 | 18 November 1989 | Stadium de Toulouse, Toulouse, France | Cyprus | 2–0 | 2–0 | 1990 FIFA World Cup qualification | |
| 2 | 21 January 1990 | Al-Sadaqua Walsalam Stadium, Kuwait City, Kuwait | Kuwait | 1–0 | 1–0 | Friendly | |
| 3 | 20 February 1991 | Parc des Princes, Paris, France | Spain | 3–1 | 3–1 | UEFA Euro 1992 qualifying | |
| 4 | 14 August 1991 | Poznań Stadium, Poznań, Poland | Poland | 4–1 | 5–1 | Friendly | |
| 5 | 17 February 1993 | Ramat Gan Stadium, Ramat Gan, Israel | Israel | 2–0 | 4–0 | 1994 FIFA World Cup qualification | |
| 6 | 17 February 1993 | Ramat Gan Stadium, Ramat Gan, Israel | Israel | 3–0 | 4–0 | 1994 FIFA World Cup qualification | |
| 7 | 8 September 1993 | Tampere Stadium, Tampere, Finland | Finland | 1–0 | 2–0 | 1994 FIFA World Cup qualification | |
| 8 | 26 April 1995 | Stade de la Beaujoire, Nantes, France | Slovakia | 3–0 | 4–0 | UEFA Euro 1996 qualifying | |
| 9 | 1 June 1996 | MHPArena, Stuttgart, Germany | Germany | 1–0 | 1–0 | Friendly | |
| 10 | 18 June 1996 | St James' Park, Newcastle, United Kingdom | Bulgaria | 1–0 | 3–1 | UEFA Euro 1996 | |
| 11 | 9 October 1996 | Parc des Princes, Paris, France | Turkey | 1–0 | 4–0 | Friendly | |
| 12 | 25 February 1998 | Stade Vélodrome, Marseille, France | Norway | 1–1 | 3–3 | Friendly | |
| 13 | 29 May 1998 | Stade Mohammed V, Casablanca, Morocco | Morocco | 1–1 | 2–2 | Friendly | |
| 14 | 28 June 1998 | Stade Bollaert-Delelis, Lens, France | Paraguay | 1–0 | 1–0 | 1998 FIFA World Cup | |
| 15 | 26 April 2000 | Stade de France, Saint-Denis, France | Slovenia | 2–2 | 3–2 | Friendly | |
| 16 | 11 June 2000 | Jan Breydel Stadium, Bruges, Belgium | Denmark | 1–0 | 3–0 | UEFA Euro 2000 | |

== Managerial statistics ==
As of 26 September 2025

Managerial record by team and tenure
| Team | Nat | From | To | Record | | | | | | | | Ref |
| Team | Nat | From | To | G | W | D | L | GF | GA | GD | Win % | Ref |
|---|---|---|---|---|---|---|---|---|---|---|---|---|
| Bordeaux | (France) | 8 June 2007 | 16 May 2010 | 159 | 93 | 31 | 35 | 261 | 160 | +101 | 58.49 | |
| France | (France) | 2 July 2010 | 30 June 2012 | 31 | 17 | 8 | 6 | 43 | 22 | +21 | 54.84 | |
| Paris Saint-Germain | (France) | 25 June 2013 | 27 June 2016 | 173 | 126 | 31 | 16 | 391 | 126 | +265 | 72.83 | |
| Al-Rayyan | (Qatar) | 19 December 2020 | 13 February 2022 | 51 | 19 | 10 | 22 | 70 | 73 | −3 | 37.25 | |
| Lyon | (France) | 9 October 2022 | 8 September 2023 | 37 | 17 | 8 | 12 | 60 | 50 | +10 | 45.95 | |
| Al-Ittihad | (Saudi Arabia) | 13 July 2024 | 28 September 2025 | 46 | 34 | 6 | 6 | 105 | 50 | +55 | 73.91 | |
| Total | | | | 497 | 306 | 94 | 97 | 930 | 481 | +449 | 61.57 | |

== Honours ==
=== Player ===
Montpellier

- Coupe de France: 1989–90

Auxerre

- Division 1: 1995–96
- Coupe de France: 1995–96

Barcelona

- Copa del Rey: 1996–97
- Supercopa de España: 1996
- UEFA Cup Winners' Cup: 1996–97

Marseille

- UEFA Cup runner-up: 1998–99

Inter Milan

- Coppa Italia runner-up: 1999–2000

Manchester United

- Premier League: 2002–03

France U21

- UEFA European Under-21 Championship: 1988

France

- FIFA World Cup: 1998
- UEFA European Championship: 2000

Individual

- UEFA European Under-21 Championship Golden Player: 1988
- French Player of the Year: 1990
- Onze Mondial: 1991, 1996, 1997, 1998, 2000
- UEFA European Championship Team of the Tournament: 1992, 1996, 2000
- ESM Team of the Year: 1995–96, 1997–98, 1998–99
- Pirata d'Oro (Inter Milan Player of the Year): 2000
- Trophée d'honneur UNFP: 2004
- Équipe type spéciale 20 ans des trophées UNFP: 2011
- French Player of the Century: 4th place

=== Manager ===
Bordeaux

- Ligue 1: 2008–09
- Coupe de la Ligue: 2008–09
- Trophée des Champions: 2008, 2009

Paris Saint-Germain

- Ligue 1: 2013–14, 2014–15, 2015–16
- Coupe de France: 2014–15, 2015–16
- Coupe de la Ligue: 2013–14, 2014–15, 2015–16
- Trophée des Champions: 2013, 2014, 2015

Al-Ittihad

- Saudi Pro League: 2024–25
- King's Cup: 2024–25

Individual

- Ligue 1 Manager of the Year: 2008, 2015, 2016
- French Manager of the Year: 2009, 2015
- Saudi Pro League Manager of the Month: October 2024, November 2024, February 2025
- Saudi Pro League Manager of the Season: 2024–25

=== Orders ===
- Knight of the Legion of Honour: 1998
