= 1995–96 Coupe de France =

Tournament details
- Country: France

Final positions
- Champions: Auxerre
- Runners-up: Nîmes

Tournament statistics
- Top goal scorer(s): Marc Libbra (5 goals)

The Coupe de France 1995–96 was its 79th edition. It was won by AJ Auxerre.

== Round of 64 ==
Team 1	Score	Team 2
Cannes (D1)	5–1	Perpignan (D2)
Monaco (D1)	1–0	Lens (D1)
Saint-Étienne (D1)	5–0	Saintes (Nat.3)
Niort (D2)	2–2 (a.e.t.) (7–6 p)	Guingamp (D1)
Charnay (Nat.3)	1–3	Metz (D1)
Blénod (Nat.3)	1–0	Bastia (D1)
Brest (Nat.1)	1–1 (a.e.t.) (3–4 p)	Nice (D1)
Gueugnon (D1)	1–2	Valence (D2)
Saint-Lô (Nat.2)	1–3	Angers (D2)
Saint-Leu (Nat.1)	0–1	Lille (D1)
La Flèche (Nat.3)	1–3	Martigues (D1)
Marienau Forbach (DH)	1–4	Dijon (Nat.1)
Nozay (DH)	0–2	Thouars (Nat.3)
Lyon (D1)	0–1	Auxerre (D1)
Saint-Quentin (Nat.3)	1–7	Nantes (D1)
Vallée d'Eure (Nat.3)	1–2	Montpellier (D1)
Paris Saint-Germain (D1)	3–1	Châteauroux (D2)
Pont-de-Roide (DH)	1–4	Bordeaux (D1)
Pontivy (Nat.3)	2–0	Trélissac (Nat.3)
Raon-l'Étape (Nat.3)	0–1	Poissy (Nat.2)
Salbris (Nat.3)	0–3	Le Havre (D1)
Toulon (Nat.1)	2–1	Pau (Nat.2)
Laval (D2)	4–1	Stade Poitevin (D2)
Caen (D2)	3–2 (a.e.t.)	Amiens (D2)
Rennes (D1)	1–2	Nancy (D2)
Toulouse Fontaines (Nat.2)	0–1	Istres (Nat.1)
Le Mans (D2)	1–0	Créteil (Nat.1)
Dunkerque (D2)	1–3	Sochaux (D2)
Endoume (Nat.3)	0–2	Marseille (D2)
Valenciennes (Nat.1)	1–2	Strasbourg (D1)
Mulhouse (D2)	3–2 (a.e.t.)	Haguenau (Nat.1)
Nîmes (Nat.1)	3–1	Saint-Priest (Nat.2)

== Round of 32 ==
Team 1	Score	Team 2
Cannes (D1)	0–1	Sochaux (D2)
Nancy (D2)	0–0 (a.e.t.) (2–4 p)	Lille (D1)
Valence (D2)	3–0	Dijon (Nat.1)
Poissy (Nat.2)	0–0 (a.e.t.) (2–4 p)	Strasbourg (D1)
Niort (D2)	1–1 (a.e.t.) (4–3 p)	Mulhouse (D2)
Thouars (Nat.1)	1–0 (a.e.t.)	Martigues (D1)
Metz (D1)	0–1	Caen (D2)
Nantes (D1)	2–2 (a.e.t.) (4–5 p)	Monaco (D1)
Nice (D1)	0–1 (a.e.t.)	Laval (D2)
Nîmes (Nat.1)	3–1	Saint-Étienne (D1)
Paris Saint-Germain (D1)	2–0	Angers (D2)
Pontivy (Nat.1)	0–2	Marseille (D2)
Toulon (Nat.1)	3–2 (a.e.t.)	Bordeaux (D1)
Le Mans (D2)	0–2	Auxerre (D1)
Blénod (Nat.3)	1–1 (a.e.t.) (4–2 p)	Le Havre (D1)
Montpellier (D1)	2–1	Istres (Nat.3)

== Round of 16 ==
Team 1	Score	Team 2
Auxerre (D1)	3–1	Paris Saint-Germain (D1)
Lille (D1)	1–1 (a.e.t.) (5–4 p)	Monaco (D1)
Niort (D2)	0–1	Strasbourg (D1)
Toulon (Nat.1)	1–1 (a.e.t.) (1–4 p)	Montpellier (D1)
Valence (D2)	1–0	Laval (D2)
Caen (D2)	5–0	Sochaux (D1)
Blénod (Nat.3)	0–2	Marseille (D2)
Thouars (Nat.1)	0–2	Nîmes (Nat.1)

== Quarter-finals ==
16 March 1996	Montpellier (1)	1–0	Caen (2)	Montpellier
	Petit 7'			Stadium: Stade de la Mosson; Attendance: 7,330; Referee: Philippe Leduc

16 March 1996	Valence (2)	0–2	Auxerre (1)	Valence
			Blanc 21'; Diomède 57'	Stadium: Stade Georges Pompidou; Attendance: 14,082; Referee: Rémi Harrel

16 March 1996	Marseille (2)	1–0	Lille (1)	Marseille
	Ferrer 80' (pen.)			Stadium: Stade Vélodrome; Attendance: 26,000; Referee: Pascal Garibian

17 March 1996	Nîmes (3)	3–2 (a.e.t.)	Strasbourg (1)	Nîmes
	Gros 32'; Perez 35'; Sabin 112'		Frankowski 12'; Mostovoi 69'	Stadium: Stade des Costières; Attendance: 6,000; Referee: Claude Colombo

== Semi-finals ==
13 April 1996	Marseille (2)	1–1 (a.e.t.) (1–3 p)	Auxerre (1)	Marseille
	Ferrer 120+4' (pen.)		Lamouchi 118'	Stadium: Stade Vélodrome; Attendance: 26,670; Referee: Alain Sars
	Penalties
	Ferreri (penalty scored); Bjeković (penalty missed); Marquet (penalty missed); Cascarino (penalty missed)		(penalty scored) Blanc; (penalty scored) Guivarc'h; (penalty scored) Silvestre

14 April 1996	Nîmes (3)	1–0	Montpellier (1)	Nîmes
	Ramdane 9'			Stadium: Stade des Costières; Attendance: 21,366; Referee: Gilles Veissière

== Final ==
4 May 1996
20:00

Auxerre	2–1	Nîmes
Blanc 52'; Laslandes 88'		Belbey 25'

Parc des Princes, Paris
Attendance: 44,921
Referee: Bernard Saules

== Topscorer ==
Marc Libbra (5 goals)
