= 2004–05 AJ Auxerre season =

Auxerre
2004–05 season
- President: Jean-Claude Hamel
- Head coach: Guy Roux
- Stadium: Stade de l'Abbé-Deschamps
- Ligue 1: 8th
- Coupe de France: Winners
- Coupe de la Ligue: Quarter-finals
- UEFA Cup: Quarter-finals
- Top goalscorer: League: Benjani Mwaruwari (11); All: Bonaventure Kalou (18)
- Average home league attendance: 11,232

The 2004–05 season was the 99th season in the existence of AJ Auxerre and the club's 25th consecutive season in the top-flight of French football. In addition to the domestic league, Auxerre participated in this season's editions of the Coupe de France, the Coupe de la Ligue and UEFA Cup.

== Season summary ==
Auxerre fell to 8th in the final table, but won the Coupe de France. Manager Guy Roux retired at the end of the season, after 44 years managing the club. He was replaced by Jacques Santini.

== First-team squad ==
Squad at end of season

Note: Flags indicate national team as defined under FIFA eligibility rules; some limited exceptions apply. Players may hold more than one non-FIFA nationality.

No.	Pos.	Nation	Player
1	GK	FRA	Fabien Cool
2	DF	FRA	Johan Radet
3	DF	FRA	Jean-Sébastien Jaurès
4	DF	SUI	Stéphane Grichting
6	MF	FRA	Philippe Violeau
7	MF	FRA	Benoît Cheyrou
8	MF	FRA	Yann Lachuer
9	FW	BEL	Luigi Pieroni
10	MF	FIN	Teemu Tainio
11	MF	CIV	Kanga Akalé
12	DF	FRA	Jean-Pascal Mignot
14	MF	FRA	David Vandenbossche
15	MF	CIV	Bonaventure Kalou
16	GK	FRA	Sébastien Hamel
17	MF	FRA	Hassan Yebda (Note: Yebda was born in Saint-Maurice, France, and represented them at every youth level between U-16 and U-19, but also qualified to represent Algeria internationally through his parents and made his international debut for Algeria in October 2009.)
18	MF	FRA	Lionel Mathis
19	MF	FRA	Pierre Vignaud
20	MF	FRA	Arnaud Gonzalez
21	FW	ZIM	Benjani Mwaruwari
22	DF	FRA	Richard Suriano
23	DF	CZE	René Bolf
24	MF	FRA	Abou Diaby
25	DF	FRA	David Recorbet
26	DF	FRA	Younès Kaboul

No.	Pos.	Nation	Player
27	DF	MLI	Mamoutou Coulibaly
28	DF	FRA	Michaël Ciani
29	DF	FRA	Bacary Sagna
30	GK	FRA	Baptiste Chabert
36	FW	FRA	Garra Dembélé (Note: Dembélé was born in Gennevilliers, France, and represented them at U-18 and U-19 level, but also qualified to represent Mali internationally through his parents and made his international debut for Mali in February 2011.)
37	MF	FRA	Kévin Lejeune
38	MF	FRA	Ferdinand Bitangane
39	DF	FRA	Mickaël Bertrand
40	GK	FRA	Mickaël Castejon
41	MF	FRA	David Dareglosse
42	MF	FRA	Nicolas Gourio
43	MF	FRA	Karim Hraiba
44	MF	FRA	Cédric Kisamba (Note: Kisamba was born in Kinshasa, DR Congo, but also qualified to represent France internationally through his parents and represented them at U-19 level.)
45	MF	FRA	Alexis Lafon
46	DF	FRA	Baptiste Martin
47	DF	FRA	David Pierre
48	GK	FRA	Stéphane Veron
49	DF	ALG	Karim Ziouane
50	MF	SEN	Ousmane Cissokho
51	MF	FRA	Damien Dufour
52	GK	FRA	Arnaud Sauvage
53	DF	TOG	Serge Akakpo
54	MF	FRA	Irélé Apo

=== Left club during season ===
Note: Flags indicate national team as defined under FIFA eligibility rules; some limited exceptions apply. Players may hold more than one non-FIFA nationality.

No.	Pos.	Nation	Player
28	FW	FRA	Romain Poyet (on loan to Clermont Foot)

== Transfers ==
=== Out ===
- Djibril Cissé - Liverpool, 1 July, £14,000,000

== Competitions ==
=== Overall record ===
Competition	First match	Last match	Starting round	Final position	Record							
Competition	First match	Last match	Starting round	Final position	Pld	W	D	L	GF	GA	GD	Win %
Ligue 1	7 August 2004	28 May 2005	Matchday 1	8th	38	14	10	14	48	47	+1	36.84
Coupe de France	8 January 2005	4 June 2005	Round of 64	Winners	6	6	0	0	12	5	+7	100.00
Coupe de la Ligue	10 November 2004	19 January 2005	Round of 32	Quarter-finals	3	1	2	0	4	3	+1	33.33
UEFA Cup	16 September 2004	14 April 2005	First round	Quarter-finals	11	6	2	3	16	10	+6	54.55
Total					58	27	14	17	80	65	+15	46.55

Source: Competitions

=== Ligue 1 ===
==== League table ====
Pos	Team	Pld	W	D	L	GF	GA	GD	Pts	Qualification or relegation
6	Saint-Étienne	38	12	17	9	47	34	+13	53	Qualification to Intertoto Cup second round
7	Lens	38	13	13	12	45	39	+6	52	Qualification to Intertoto Cup second round
8	Auxerre	38	14	10	14	48	47	+1	52	Qualification to UEFA Cup first round (Note: Auxerre was qualified for the 2005–06 UEFA Cup as winners of the 2004–05 Coupe de France.)
9	Paris Saint-Germain	38	12	15	11	40	41	−1	51	
10	Sochaux	38	13	11	14	42	41	+1	50	

Source: Ligue 1
Rules for classification: 1) points; 2) goal difference; 3) number of goals scored.

==== Results summary ====
Overall								Home						Away					
Pld	W	D	L	GF	GA	GD	Pts	W	D	L	GF	GA	GD	W	D	L	GF	GA	GD
38	14	10	14	48	47	+1	52	10	7	2	33	19	+14	4	3	12	15	28	−13

==== Results by round ====
Round	1	2	3	4	5	6	7	8	9	10	11	12	13	14	15	16	17	18	19	20	21	22	23	24	25	26	27	28	29	30	31	32	33	34	35	36	37	38
Ground	A	H	A	H	A	H	A	H	A	H	A	H	A	H	A	A	H	A	H	A	H	A	H	A	H	A	H	A	H	A	H	A	H	H	A	H	A	H
Result	L	W	W	W	L	W	L	D	W	W	D	D	D	W	L	L	D	W	W	L	W	W	W	L	D	L	W	L	D	L	W	L	D	L	D	D	L	L
Position	20	10	6	2	6	2	5	5	4	3	3	3	3	3	4	4	5	4	3	4	4	4	3	4	5	5	5	5	5	5	5	6	6	6	6	5	7	8

A = Away; H = Home; W = Win; D = Draw; L = Loss

==== Matches ====
7 August 2004 1	Lille	2–0	Auxerre	Villeneuve-d'Ascq
20:00 CEST (UTC+2)		Report		Stadium: Stadium Lille Métropole

14 August 2004 2	Auxerre	3–1	Rennes	Auxerre
20:00 CEST (UTC+2)		Report		Stadium: Stade de l'Abbé Deschamps

21 August 2004 3	Sochaux	1–2	Auxerre	Montbéliard
20:00 CEST (UTC+2)		Report		Stadium: Stade Auguste Bonal

28 August 2004 4	Auxerre	1–0	Caen	Auxerre
20:00 CEST (UTC+2)		Report		Stadium: Stade de l'Abbé Deschamps

11 September 2004 5	Bastia	1–0	Auxerre	Furiani
17:15 CEST (UTC+2)		Report		Stadium: Stade Armand Cesari

19 September 2004 6	Auxerre	4–0	Metz	Auxerre
19:00 CEST (UTC+2)		Report		Stadium: Stade de l'Abbé Deschamps

22 September 2004 7	Saint-Étienne	3–1	Auxerre	Saint-Étienne
20:30 CEST (UTC+2)		Report		Stadium: Stade Geoffroy-Guichard

25 September 2004 8	Auxerre	0–0	Istres	Auxerre
20:00 CEST (UTC+2)		Report		Stadium: Stade de l'Abbé Deschamps

3 October 2004 9	Toulouse	1–2	Auxerre	Toulouse
18:00 CEST (UTC+2)		Report		Stadium: Stadium de Toulouse

16 October 2004 10	Auxerre	3–0	Lens	Auxerre
17:15 CEST (UTC+2)		Report		Stadium: Stade de l'Abbé Deschamps

24 October 2004 11	Monaco	0–0	Auxerre	Monaco
18:00 CEST (UTC+2)		Report		Stadium: Stade Louis II

30 October 2004 12	Auxerre	1–1	Paris Saint-Germain	Auxerre
20:00 CEST (UTC+2)		Report		Stadium: Stade de l'Abbé Deschamps

7 November 2004 13	Nantes	1–1	Auxerre	Nantes
18:00 CET (UTC+1)		Report		Stadium: Stade de la Beaujoire

13 November 2004 14	Auxerre	1–0	Ajaccio	Auxerre
20:00 CET (UTC+1)		Report		Stadium: Stade de l'Abbé Deschamps

20 November 2004 15	Strasbourg	3–1	Auxerre	Strasbourg
20:00 CET (UTC+1)		Report		Stadium: Stade de la Meinau

27 November 2004 16	Lyon	2–1	Auxerre	Lyon
17:15 CET (UTC+1)		Report		Stadium: Stade de Gerland

5 December 2004 17	Auxerre	0–0	Bordeaux	Auxerre
21:00 CET (UTC+1)		Report		Stadium: Stade de l'Abbé Deschamps

11 December 2004 18	Marseille	0–1	Auxerre	Marseille
17:15 CET (UTC+1)		Report		Stadium: Stade Vélodrome

18 December 2004 19	Auxerre	4–3	Nice	Auxerre
20:00 CET (UTC+1)		Report		Stadium: Stade de l'Abbé Deschamps

12 January 2005 20	Rennes	1–0	Auxerre	Rennes
20:30 CET (UTC+1)		Report		Stadium: Stade de la Route de Lorient

15 January 2005 21	Auxerre	2–0	Sochaux	Auxerre
17:15 CET (UTC+1)		Report		Stadium: Stade de l'Abbé Deschamps

22 January 2005 22	Caen	0–2	Auxerre	Caen
20:00 CET (UTC+1)		Report		Stadium: Stade Michel d'Ornano

26 January 2005 23	Auxerre	4–1	Bastia	Auxerre
20:30 CET (UTC+1)		Report		Stadium: Stade de l'Abbé Deschamps

29 January 2005 24	Metz	3–0	Auxerre	Metz
20:00 CET (UTC+1)		Report		Stadium: Stade Saint-Symphorien

5 February 2005 25	Auxerre	2–2	Saint-Étienne	Auxerre
20:00 CET (UTC+1)		Report		Stadium: Stade de l'Abbé Deschamps

20 February 2005 26	Istres	1–0	Auxerre	Nîmes
18:00 CET (UTC+1)		Report		Stadium: Stade des Costières

5 March 2005 28	Lens	3–1	Auxerre	Lens
17:15 CET (UTC+1)		Report		Stadium: Stade Félix-Bollaert

13 March 2005 29	Auxerre	2–2	Monaco	Auxerre
21:00 CET (UTC+1)		Report		Stadium: Stade de l'Abbé Deschamps

20 March 2005 30	Paris Saint-Germain	1–0	Auxerre	Paris
18:00 CET (UTC+1)		Report		Stadium: Parc des Princes

2 April 2005 31	Auxerre	2–1	Nantes	Auxerre
17:15 CEST (UTC+2)		Report		Stadium: Stade de l'Abbé Deschamps

10 April 2005 32	Ajaccio	4–3	Auxerre	Ajaccio
18:00 CEST (UTC+2)		Report		Stadium: Stade François Coty

17 April 2005 33	Auxerre	0–0	Strasbourg	Auxerre
18:00 CEST (UTC+2)		Report		Stadium: Stade de l'Abbé Deschamps

24 April 2005 34	Auxerre	0–3	Lyon	Auxerre
21:00 CEST (UTC+2)		Report		Stadium: Stade de l'Abbé Deschamps

29 April 2005 27	Auxerre	3–2	Toulouse	Auxerre
20:00 CEST (UTC+2)		Report		Stadium: Stade de l'Abbé Deschamps

6 May 2005 35	Bordeaux	0–0	Auxerre	Bordeaux
20:30 CEST (UTC+2)		Report		Stadium: Stade Chaban-Delmas

14 May 2005 36	Auxerre	0–0	Marseille	Auxerre
20:00 CEST (UTC+2)		Report		Stadium: Stade de l'Abbé Deschamps

21 May 2005 37	Nice	1–0	Auxerre	Nice
20:45 CEST (UTC+2)		Report		Stadium: Stade du Ray

28 May 2005 38	Auxerre	1–3	Lille	Auxerre
20:00 CEST (UTC+2)		Report		Stadium: Stade de l'Abbé Deschamps

=== Coupe de France ===
8 January 2005 Round of 64	Calais	0–1	Auxerre	Calais
				Stadium: Stade de l'Épopée

12 February 2005 Round of 32	Vannes	0–2	Auxerre	Vannes
				Stadium: Stade de la Rabine

2 March 2005 Round of 16	Auxerre	3–2	Paris Saint-Germain	Auxerre
				Stadium: Stade de l'Abbé-Deschamps

20 April 2005 Quarter-finals	Boulogne	1–2 (a.e.t.)	Auxerre	Lens
				Stadium: Stade Bollaert-Delelis

10 May 2005 Semi-finals	Auxerre	2–1	Nîmes	Auxerre
	Kalou 46' (o.g.); Tainio 78'		Verschave 90+3'	Stadium: Stade de l'Abbé-Deschamps

4 June 2005 Final	Sedan	1–2	Auxerre	Saint-Denis
20:45 CEST (UTC+2)	Noro 63'		Benjani 37'; Kalou 90'	Stadium: Stade de France; Attendance: 78,721; Referee: Bruno Derrien

=== Coupe de la Ligue ===
10 November 2004 Round of 32	Rennes	1–1 (a.e.t.) (3–5 p)	Auxerre	Rennes
	Källström 54'		Dudu Cearense 85' (o.g.)	Stadium: Stade de la Route de Lorient; Attendance: 19,553; Referee: Laurent Duhamel
	Penalties
	Källström (penalty scored); Dudu Cearense (penalty scored); Mvuemba (penalty missed); Sorlin (penalty scored)		(penalty scored) Cheyrou; (penalty scored) Benjani; (penalty scored) Vandenbossche; (penalty scored) Akalé; (penalty scored) Lachuer

22 December 2004 Round of 16	Auxerre	2–1	Nantes	Auxerre
	Pieroni 79'; Benjani 87'		Ahamada 20'	Stadium: Stade de l'Abbé-Deschamps; Attendance: 10,472; Referee: Claude Colombo

19 January 2005 Quarter-finals	Auxerre	1–1 (a.e.t.) (5–6 p)	Caen	Auxerre
	Pieroni 107'		Watier 110'	Stadium: Stade de l'Abbé-Deschamps; Attendance: 7,549; Referee: Éric Poulat
	Penalties
	Jaurès (penalty scored); Cheyrou (penalty scored); Kalou (penalty scored); Benjani (penalty scored); Pieroni (penalty scored); Mignot (penalty missed)		(penalty scored) Askar; (penalty scored) Zubar; (penalty scored) Watier; (penalty scored) Hengbart; (penalty scored) Deroin; (penalty scored) Jovičić

=== UEFA Cup ===
==== First round ====
16 September 2004 First leg	Aalborg (Denmark)	1–1	(France) Auxerre	Aalborg, Denmark
19:00 CEST (UTC+2)	Borgersen 43'	Report	Benjani 38'	Stadium: Aalborg Stadion; Referee: Milan Šedivý (Czech Republic)

30 September 2004 Second leg	Auxerre (France)	2–0 (3–1 agg.)	(Denmark) Aalborg	Auxerre, France
20:45 CEST (UTC+2)	Kalou 4'; Benjani 74'	Report		Stadium: Stade de l'Abbé-Deschamps; Referee: Peter Sippel (Germany)

==== Group stage ====
Pos	Team	Pld	W	D	L	GF	GA	GD	Pts	Qualification
1	(Netherlands) AZ	4	3	0	1	6	3	+3	9	Advance to knockout stage
2	(France) Auxerre	4	2	1	1	7	3	+4	7	Advance to knockout stage
3	(Austria) GAK	4	2	1	1	5	4	+1	7	Advance to knockout stage
4	(Scotland) Rangers	4	2	0	2	8	3	+5	6	
5	(Poland) Amica Wronki	4	0	0	4	3	16	−13	0	

Source: RSSSF

21 October 2004 1	Auxerre (France)	0–0	(Austria) GAK	Auxerre, France
20:45 CEST (UTC+2)		Report		Stadium: Stade de l'Abbé-Deschamps; Referee: Fernando Carmona Méndez (Spain)

4 November 2004 2	AZ (Netherlands)	2–0	(France) Auxerre	Alkmaar, Netherlands
21:15 CET (UTC+1)	Huysegems 2', 18'	Report		Stadium: Alkmaarderhout; Referee: Andy D'Urso (England)

2 December 2004 3	Auxerre (France)	5–1	(Poland) Amica Wronki	Auxerre, France
20:45 CET (UTC+1)	Mignot 1'; Pieroni 5', 24', 26'; Kalou 56'	Report	Kryszałowicz 14'	Stadium: Stade de l'Abbé-Deschamps; Referee: Georgios Douros (Greece)

15 December 2004 4	Rangers (Scotland)	0–2	(France) Auxerre	Glasgow, Scotland
20:45 CET (UTC+1)		Report	Kalou 9', 46'	Stadium: Ibrox Stadium; Referee: Franz-Xaver Wack (Germany)

==== Round of 32 ====
16 February 2005 First leg	Ajax (Netherlands)	1–0	(France) Auxerre	Amsterdam, Netherlands
20:00 CET (UTC+1)	Maxwell 36'	Report		Stadium: Amsterdam Arena; Referee: Jaroslav Jára (Czech Republic)

24 February 2005 Second leg	Auxerre (France)	3–1 (3–2 agg.)	(Netherlands) Ajax	Auxerre, France
20:45 CET (UTC+1)	Kalou 31'; Cheyrou 55'; Mathis 86'	Report	Babel 36'	Stadium: Stade de l'Abbé-Deschamps; Referee: Olegário Benquerença (Portugal)

==== Round of 16 ====
10 March 2005 First leg	Lille (France)	0–1	(France) Auxerre	Villeneuve-d'Ascq, France
20:30 CET (UTC+1)		Report	Akalé 45'	Stadium: Stadium Lille Métropole; Referee: Yuri Baskakov (Russia)

17 March 2005 Second leg	Auxerre (France)	0–0 (1–0 agg.)	(France) Lille	Auxerre, France
20:45 CET (UTC+1)		Report		Stadium: Stade de l'Abbé-Deschamps; Referee: Mike RIley (England)

==== Quarter-finals ====
7 April 2005 First leg	CSKA Moscow (Russia)	4–0	(France) Auxerre	Moscow, Russia
18:30 CEST (UTC+2)	Odiah 21'; Ignashevich 63' (pen.); Vágner Love 71'; Gusev 77'	Report		Stadium: Lokomotiv Stadium; Referee: Luis Medina Cantalejo (Spain)

14 April 2005 Second leg	Auxerre (France)	2–0 (2–4 agg.)	(Russia) CSKA Moscow	Auxerre, France
20:45 CEST (UTC+2)	Lachuer 9'; Kalou 78' (pen.)	Report		Stadium: Stade de l'Abbé-Deschamps; Referee: Wolfgang Stark (Germany)
