= Benjani Mwaruwari =

Zimbabwean footballer (born 1978)

Benjani
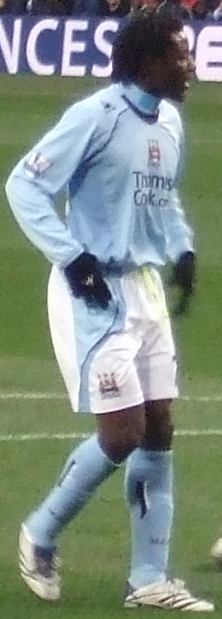
- Benjani playing for Manchester City in 2008

Personal information
- Date of birth: 13 August 1978 (age 48)
- Place of birth: Bulawayo, Rhodesia
- Height: 1.82 m (6 ft 0 in)
- Position: Striker

Youth career
- 1996–1999: Air Zimbabwe Jets

Senior career*
Years	Team	Apps	(Gls)
1999–2002	Jomo Cosmos	45	(20)
2001–2002	→ Grasshoppers (loan)	25	(1)
2002–2006	Auxerre	72	(19)
2006–2008	Portsmouth	70	(19)
2008–2010	Manchester City	23	(4)
2010	→ Sunderland (loan)	8	(0)
2010–2011	Blackburn Rovers	18	(3)
2011–2012	Portsmouth	18	(1)
2012–2013	Chippa United	9	(1)
2013–2014	Bidvest Wits	15	(0)
Total		303	(68)

International career
1999–2010	Zimbabwe	42	(10)

Managerial career
- 2026–: Highlanders
- * Club domestic league appearances and goals

Benjani Mwaruwari (born 13 August 1978), often known mononymously as Benjani, is a Zimbabwean former professional footballer and coach who played as a striker.

Having started his career with the Jomo Cosmos, Benjani moved to Europe in 2001 to join Swiss side Grasshopper Club Zürich, before moving to Auxerre a year later. He signed with Premier League club Portsmouth in 2006, then went on to play in England's top flight for Manchester City, Sunderland and Blackburn Rovers before returning to Portsmouth in 2011. The following year, he returned to South Africa with Chippa United and then the Bidvest Wits.

From 1999 to 2010, Benjani played a total of 31 times for the Zimbabwe national team and played at the 2006 Africa Cup of Nations. After his retirement, he became the national team's assistant coach.

He worked with the Plymouth Argyle Academy as part of the Premier League player-to-coach initiative.

As of February 2026, he coaches Zimbabwean club Highlanders.

== Club career ==
=== Early career ===
Benjani came to Jomo Cosmos after impressing in a friendly match between South Africa and Zimbabwe in 1999. There, he met his mentor Jomo Sono. Two years later, he was voted PSL Player of the Season and PSL Players' Player of the Season.

=== Grasshopper and Auxerre ===
Benjani was loaned to Swiss club Grasshopper Club Zürich in 2001. In 2002, Guy Roux took him to Auxerre. Benjani had a good run at the start, capitalising from Djibril Cissé's absence, becoming top goalscorer in Ligue 1. Roux never played the two together, and eventually Benjani found himself surplus to requirements under Roux's successor, Jacques Santini, this time forced out of the 4–5–1 formation by Luigi Pieroni. While at Auxerre, Benjani scored the opening goal in the 2005 Coupe de France final as they defeated CS Sedan. He also played as a substitute in the final as they won the tournament two years earlier in 2003. On 5 January 2006, English Premier League club Portsmouth signed him from Auxerre for £4.1 million after Arsenal manager Arsène Wenger recommended the player to Harry Redknapp.

This transfer from Auxerre to Portsmouth in January 2006 is one of those about which the Stevens inquiry report in June 2007 expressed concerns:

"Agent Willie McKay acted for the selling club, Auxerre, in the transfer of Benjani and, for the same reason as above" (still awaiting clarification) "the inquiry is not prepared to clear these transfers at this stage."

"In relation to Benjani's transfer, the enquiry also has identified concerns regarding the role of (agent) Teni Yerima and (third party) Ralph N'Komo."

=== Portsmouth ===
Benjani failed to score in his first fourteen games for the club, but became a crowd favourite because of his high workrate and assists for other players. Benjani finally got his first goal for Portsmouth against Wigan Athletic on 29 April 2006 in a 2–1 victory which saw Portsmouth avoid relegation from the Premier League. On 29 September 2007, Benjani scored three goals for Portsmouth in a 7–4 win over Reading, which broke the record for the Premier League match with the highest number of goals scored. After Portsmouth's visit to Wigan on 20 October, Benjani became the Premier League's top scorer.

Portsmouth boss Harry Redknapp banned Benjani from taking any further penalties after he missed a spot-kick in second-half injury time in a home game against West Ham United. He then made amends for his miss scoring in the 4–1 victory over Newcastle United to bring his total to eight for the season. He then scored his ninth of the season, albeit a consolation goal in a 4–1 defeat at Liverpool. On 19 January 2008, Benjani earned his second Portsmouth hat-trick, scoring all of his side's goals in a 3–1 victory over Derby County at Fratton Park. This took his tally for the season to 12 and subsequently resulted in him revising his target for the season, which had been 10.

Benjani's goalscoring form during the first half of the 2007–08 season cemented Manchester City manager Sven-Göran Eriksson's interest in the striker, and on 31 January 2008 he had a bid of around £7.6 million accepted for the transfer of the player. However, it was revealed that Benjani had missed two successive planes to Manchester, meaning he did not arrive at the club's training ground until 11:10 pm, leaving insufficient time to complete a move before the midnight deadline. Portsmouth had already confirmed the signing of Benjani's replacement, Jermain Defoe from Tottenham Hotspur.

=== Manchester City ===
A transfer was completed for Benjani to move to Manchester City on 5 February 2008 for a fee of £3.87 million on a two-and-a-half-year deal. Further payments could be made if the player makes up to 75 senior starts which would raise the fee to a total of £7.6 million. His wage was reported at £50,000 a week His debut came on 10 February 2008 against rivals Manchester United in a 2–1 victory to City. He scored the second goal from a header in his first Manchester derby. His first goal at the City of Manchester Stadium was against his former club Portsmouth on 20 April 2008, although Benjani refused to celebrate after the goal out of respect for his former club, stating in a post match interview that he would never celebrate a goal against Portsmouth because the club and its fans had been so good to him. His next goal came in the 3–2 home loss against Fulham.

After a lengthy thigh injury, Benjani made a goal scoring return for the reserves, before following this up days later by making an impact as a second half substitute, scoring what would be the winning goal in City's 3–2 win over Twente. He scored again in the UEFA Cup with an away goal against Schalke 04. His former club Portsmouth were fined £15,000 for his transfer to and from the club, after they were found to have breached transfer rules.

Benjani entered talks with Hull City over a transfer to the club in August 2009, but negotiations ended after he failed to agree personal terms. He was also linked with a return to former club Portsmouth as well as West Ham and Stoke City of the Premier League and League Two club Notts County.

Under new Manchester City manager Roberto Mancini, Benjani started his first game of the 2009–10 season in a third round FA Cup tie away to Middlesbrough on 2 January 2010, during which he scored the only goal just before half-time in a 1–0 win.

On 8 June 2010, it was announced that Benjani's contract had expired and that he would be leaving the club, along with Sylvinho, Karl Moore and Martin Petrov.

On 2 February 2010, Benjani moved to Sunderland on loan until the end of the season, after the Premier League confirmed that the paperwork had been completed before the transfer deadline. On 18 May 2010, Steve Bruce confirmed that Benjani would not be offered a permanent deal.

=== Blackburn Rovers ===
After a month of being a free agent and considering his options, it was revealed that Benjani was training with Premier League team Blackburn Rovers in the hopes of earning a deal with the club. On 27 August, he signed a one-year deal with Blackburn, with an option of a further year at Ewood Park. He made his debut in a 1–1 draw against Fulham at Ewood Park on 18 September, replacing Nikola Kalinić in the 65th minute of the game. He made his first start for Blackburn against Aston Villa in the third round of the League Cup, at Villa Park on 22 September. He scored the first goal, a glancing header, in Blackburn's home game to Chelsea, on 30 October in the 21st minute, in a 2–1 defeat playing 46 minutes and being substituted by fellow striker Jason Roberts. He made his 10th appearance for the club as a substitute against West Ham in a 1–1 draw on 18 December. Also against West Ham he miss kicked a clear shooting opportunity which fell to captain and New Zealand skipper Ryan Nelsen who also sliced it but in the end he scored with the ball deflecting in off his thigh. On 5 January 2011, he scored two goals against Liverpool in a 3–1 win at Ewood Park.

On 21 July 2011, Benjani declined the new contract terms offered to him by Rovers and left the club. In August 2011, he began training with Conference National side Stockport County who were managed by Benjani's former Manchester City teammate Dietmar Hamann.

=== Return to Portsmouth ===
On 13 August 2011 (his 33rd birthday), it was announced that Benjani had re-signed for Portsmouth. He was unveiled to the crowd at Fratton Park before the Championship clash against Brighton & Hove Albion after signing a one-year deal. His first match was against Reading on 16 August 2011 as a 75th-minute substitute. He scored his first goal in his second spell for Portsmouth in a 3–2 defeat at home to Peterborough United on 27 September 2011. Benjani, however, played less under manager Michael Appleton and could not produce his form like he did in his previous spell at Portsmouth. After a poor season, Benjani was not offered a new contract and was subsequently released. After his release, Benjani wrote a goodbye message to Portsmouth fans, saying:

The times at Pompey were the best for me. It's sad to be going and, of course, it's hard to leave. It's hard to leave any team, but Portsmouth isn't just any team to me. I've never been anything but happy at Portsmouth. It's been a hard season for everyone at the club and these are hard times. For me the fans are the key to the club and everything that happens. So it's tough to see them going through a difficult time, for me. It's hard for the players, but I feel more for the fans than I do the rest of the team. But I have so much love for the fans, and I want them to know that. The injuries are fine and I feel good. If you don't play for a long time, like last season, it is always going to be difficult. As a player, though, you take it as it comes. It was a hard time for me last season and it was difficult, but that is life. At the moment, I don't know whether I'm going to play on. I'm looking for a club, but if it doesn't happen I will find something else to do.

=== Later career ===
On 1 October 2012, it was announced that Benjani had joined Supersport United on a one-year deal. The deal later collapsed.

On 27 February 2013, it was announced that Benjani had joined Chippa United on a deal until the end of the season. Chippa United Head of Communication, Lukanyo Mzinzi confirmed that Benjani would move to Chippa, and revealed they have the option to renew Benjani's contract, that expires at the end of the current season. He made his debut on 6 March 2013 against Kaizer Chiefs. In 2020, he was the coach for Evercreech Rovers in the Mid-Somerset football league.

He is now an academy coach with Plymouth Argyle.

== International career ==
Benjani is a former captain of the Zimbabwe national team, having taken the armband from striker Peter Ndlovu when he retired from international football after the 2006 African Cup of Nations. He is the third Zimbabwean to play in the Premier League after goalkeeper Bruce Grobbelaar, who played for Liverpool, and Ndlovu, who played for Coventry City and Sheffield United amongst others.

During the run up to the 2006 African Cup of Nations, Benjani provided the funding for the senior national team's stay in France when they were preparing for the competition.

Benjani retired from international football on 11 October 2010, following Zimbabwe's 0–0 draw with Cape Verde. He gained 24 international caps, scoring four goals.

== Career statistics ==
=== Club ===
Appearances and goals by club, season and competition
Club	Season	League			National cup		League cup		Continental		Other		Total	
Club	Season	Division	Apps	Goals	Apps	Goals	Apps	Goals	Apps	Goals	Apps	Goals	Apps	Goals
Jomo Cosmos	1999–2000	Premier Soccer League	15	7					–		–		15	7
Jomo Cosmos	2000–01	Premier Soccer League	30	13					–		–		30	13
Jomo Cosmos	Total		45	20	0	0	0	0	0	0	0	0	45	20
Grasshoppers (loan)	2001–02	Nationalliga A	25	1			–		7	2	–		32	3
Auxerre	2002–03	Ligue 1	27	7	5	1	1	0	10	2	–		43	10
Auxerre	2003–04	Ligue 1	3	0	0	0	0	0	0	0	–		3	0
Auxerre	2004–05	Ligue 1	31	11	6	3	3	1	10	2	–		50	17
Auxerre	2005–06	Ligue 1	11	1	0	0	1	1	2	0	–		14	2
Auxerre	Total		72	19	11	4	5	2	22	4	0	0	110	29
Portsmouth	2005–06	Premier League	16	1	0	0	0	0	–		–		16	1
Portsmouth	2006–07	Premier League	31	6	2	0	1	0	–		–		34	6
Portsmouth	2007–08	Premier League	23	12	1	0	3	0	–		–		27	12
Portsmouth	Total		70	19	3	0	4	0	0	0	0	0	77	19
Manchester City	2007–08	Premier League	13	3	0	0	0	0	–		–		13	3
Manchester City	2008–09	Premier League	8	1	0	0	0	0	4	2	–		12	3
Manchester City	2009–10	Premier League	2	0	2	1	2	0	–		–		6	1
Manchester City	Total		23	4	2	1	2	0	4	2	0	0	31	7
Sunderland (loan)	2009–10	Premier League	8	0	0	0	0	0	–		–		8	0
Blackburn Rovers	2010–11	Premier League	18	3	2	0	1	0	–		–		21	3
Portsmouth	2011–12	Championship	18	1	0	0	0	0	–		–		18	1
Chippa United	2012–13	Premier Soccer League	9	1	0	0	0	0	–		2 (Note: Appearances in South African Premier Division play-offs)	0	11	1
Bidvest Wits	2013–14	South African Premier Division	15	0	0	0	1	0	–		1 (Note: Appearance in MTN 8)	0	17	0
Career total			303	68	18	5	13	2	33	8	3	0	370	83

=== International ===
Appearances and goals by national team and year
National team	Year	Apps	Goals
Zimbabwe	1999	6	0
Zimbabwe	2000	7	3
Zimbabwe	2001	5	3
Zimbabwe	2002	3	0
Zimbabwe	2003	2	0
Zimbabwe	2004	1	0
Zimbabwe	2005	4	3
Zimbabwe	2006	4	1
Zimbabwe	2007	3	0
Zimbabwe	2008	5	0
Zimbabwe	2009	0	0
Zimbabwe	2010	2	0
Total		42	10

Scores and results list Zimbabwe's goal tally first, score column indicates score after each Mwaruwari goal.

List of international goals scored by Benjani Mwaruwari
No.	Date	Venue	Opponent	Score	Result	Competition	Ref.
1	1 July 2000	Stade Linité, Victoria, Seychelles	Seychelles	1-0	1-0	2002 African Cup of Nations qualification	
2	27 August 2000	Barbourfields Stadium, Bulawayo, Zimbabwe	Lesotho	3-0	3-0	2000 COSAFA Cup	
3	8 October 2000	Accra Sports Stadium, Accra, Ghana	Ghana	1-2	1-4	2002 African Cup of Nations qualification	
4	14 January 2001	Barbourfields Stadium, Bulawayo, Zimbabwe	Lesotho	1-0	1-2	2002 African Cup of Nations qualification	
5	11 March 2001	National Sports Stadium, Harare, Zimbabwe	Malawi	1-0	2-0	2002 FIFA World Cup qualification	
6	17 June 2001	Stade des Martyrs, Kinshasa, Democratic Republic of Congo	DR Congo	1-0	1-2	2002 African Cup of Nations qualification	
7	27 March 2005	National Sports Stadium, Harare, Zimbabwe	Angola	2-0	2-0	2006 FIFA World Cup qualification	
8	4 September 2005	National Sports Stadium, Harare, Zimbabwe	Rwanda	3-0	3-1	2006 FIFA World Cup qualification	
9	8 October 2005	Moshood Abiola National Stadium, Abuja, Nigeria	Nigeria	1-2	1-5	2006 FIFA World Cup qualification	
10	31 January 2006	Ismailia Stadium, Ismailia, Egypt	Ghana	2-0	2-1	2006 Africa Cup of Nations	

== Honours ==
Auxerre

- Coupe de France: 2002–03, 2004–05
