= 2007–08 Portsmouth F.C. season =

Portsmouth
2007–08 season
- Manager: Harry Redknapp
- Stadium: Fratton Park
- Premier League: 8th
- FA Cup: Winners
- League Cup: Fourth round
- Top goalscorer: Benjani (12)
- Highest home attendance: 20,556 vs. Arsenal (26 December 2007)
- Lowest home attendance: 17,108 vs. Bolton Wanderers (18 August 2007)
- Average home league attendance: 19,914

Portsmouth F.C. won their first major trophy since 1950, thanks to an FA Cup campaign that saw them beat Cardiff City in the final. The run to the final included a surprise 1–0 victory against Manchester United at Old Trafford, thanks to a Sulley Muntari penalty.

The millions of pounds invested in the squad on players such as Glen Johnson, Lassana Diarra, Muntari and others also enabled Portsmouth to have an unprecedented run in the modern Premier League era, finishing in eighth despite losing the last few matches of the season. During the autumn, Portsmouth was involved in the battle for a Champions League spot, thanks to its surprise form. The season also saw a remarkable game, beating Reading by 7–4 at Fratton Park, following eight goals in the second half.

However, despite the success in the FA Cup and league, the club's overspending on players would lead to a financial crisis that would see Portsmouth enter administration twice and suffer relegation to the fourth tier within five seasons.

== Players ==
=== First-team squad ===
Squad at end of season

Note: Flags indicate national team as defined under FIFA eligibility rules; some limited exceptions apply. Players may hold more than one non-FIFA nationality.

No.	Pos.	Nation	Player
1	GK	ENG	David James
3	DF	FRA	Lucien Aubey (Note: Aubey was born in Brazzaville, Republic of the Congo, but also qualified to represent France internationally and represented France at U-21 level before making his international debut for the Republic of the Congo in August 2009.) (on loan from Lens)
4	DF	CMR	Lauren
5	DF	ENG	Glen Johnson
6	MF	FRA	Lassana Diarra
7	DF	ISL	Hermann Hreiðarsson
8	MF	SEN	Papa Bouba Diop
9	FW	CZE	Milan Baroš (on loan from Lyon)
10	FW	ENG	David Nugent
11	MF	GHA	Sulley Muntari
14	FW	ENG	Jermain Defoe
15	DF	FRA	Sylvain Distin
16	DF	FRA	Noé Pamarot

No.	Pos.	Nation	Player
17	FW	NGR	John Utaka
18	MF	COD	Arnold Mvuemba (Note: Mvuemba was born in Alençon, France, and represented France at U-21 level, but also qualified to represent the Democratic Republic of the Congo internationally and made his international debut for the Democratic Republic of the Congo in 2005.)
19	MF	CRO	Niko Kranjčar
20	DF	ENG	Martin Cranie
21	GK	ENG	Jamie Ashdown
22	MF	SCO	Richard Hughes
23	DF	ENG	Sol Campbell (captain)
27	FW	NGR	Nwankwo Kanu
28	MF	ENG	Sean Davis
30	MF	POR	Pedro Mendes
31	GK	CAN	Asmir Begović (Note: Begović was born in Trebinje, SFR Yugoslavia (now Bosnia and Herzegovina), but was raised in Germany between the ages of 4 and 10 and in Canada from the age of 10 and represented Canada at U-20 level before making his international debut for Bosnia and Herzegovina in October 2009.)
34	MF	FRA	Franck Songo'o (Note: Songo'o was born in Yaoundé, Cameroon, but was raised in France from the age of 2 and represented France at U-19 level and Cameroon at U-23 level, before making his international debut for Cameroon in September 2008.)

=== Left club during season ===
Note: Flags indicate national team as defined under FIFA eligibility rules; some limited exceptions apply. Players may hold more than one non-FIFA nationality.

No.	Pos.	Nation	Player
3	DF	SRB	Dejan Stefanović (to Fulham)
6	DF	MLI	Djimi Traoré (Note: Traoré was born in Saint-Ouen, France, but also qualified to represent Mali internationally and made his international debut for Mali in 2004.) (on loan to Rennes)
14	MF	ENG	Matthew Taylor (to Bolton Wanderers)
25	FW	ZIM	Benjani Mwaruwari (to Manchester City)

No.	Pos.	Nation	Player
26	MF	ENG	Gary O'Neil (to Middlesbrough)
32	FW	COD	Lomana LuaLua (to Olympiacos)
33	DF	IRL	Andy O'Brien (Note: O'Brien was born in Harrogate, England, and represented England at U-18 level, but also qualified to represent the Republic of Ireland internationally and represented the Republic of Ireland at U-21 level before making his international debut for the Republic of Ireland in 2001.) (to Bolton Wanderers)

=== Reserve squad ===
The following players did not appear for the first-team this season.

Note: Flags indicate national team as defined under FIFA eligibility rules; some limited exceptions apply. Players may hold more than one non-FIFA nationality.

No.	Pos.	Nation	Player
2	DF	ENG	Linvoy Primus
24	DF	WAL	Richard Duffy
35	DF	IRL	Marc Wilson (Note: Wilson was born in Aghagallon, Northern Ireland, and represented Northern Ireland at U-15 level, but also qualified to represent the Republic of Ireland internationally and represented the Republic of Ireland at U-18, U-19 and U-21 level before making his international debut for the Republic of Ireland in February 2011.)
—	GK	ENG	Nicholas Jordan
—	DF	ENG	Callum Reynolds
—	DF	ENG	Joel Ward
—	MF	ENG	Tom Kilbey

No.	Pos.	Nation	Player
—	MF	ENG	Marlon Pack
—	MF	ENG	Matt Ritchie (Note: Ritchie was born in Gosport, England, but also qualified to represent Scotland internationally through his father and made his international debut for Scotland in March 2015.)
—	MF	FRA	Jean-François Christophe
—	FW	DEN	Adda Djeziri
—	FW	BEL	Andréa Mbuyi-Mutombo (Note: Mbuyi-Mutombo was born in Brussels, Belgium, and represented Belgium at U-19 level, but also qualified to represent the Democratic Republic of the Congo internationally and made his international debut for the Democratic Republic of the Congo in 2011.)
—	FW	SUI	Danijel Subotić (Note: Subotić was born in Zagreb, Yugoslavia (now Croatia), but also qualified to represent Switzerland internationally and represented Switzerland at U-19 level.)

== Transfers ==
=== In ===
Date	Nation	Position	Name	From	Transfer Fee
23 May 2007	(France)	DF	Sylvain Distin	Manchester City	Free Transfer
25 May 2007	(Iceland)	DF	Hermann Hreiðarsson	Charlton Athletic	Free Transfer
30 May 2007	(Ghana)	MF	Sulley Muntari	Udinese	£7,000,000
26 June 2007	(England)	DF	Martin Cranie	Southampton	Free Transfer
5 July 2007	(Democratic Republic of the Congo)	MF	Arnold Mvuemba	Stade Rennais	Undisclosed
11 July 2007	(England)	FW	David Nugent	Preston North End	£6,000,000
11 July 2007	(Nigeria)	FW	John Utaka	Stade Rennais	£7,000,000
31 August 2007	(England)	DF	Glen Johnson	Chelsea	£4,000,000
31 August 2007	(Senegal)	MF	Papa Bouba Diop	Fulham	Undisclosed
7 January 2008	(Switzerland)	FW	Danijel Subotić	FC Basel	Undisclosed
17 January 2008	(France)	MF	Lassana Diarra	Arsenal	Undisclosed
31 January 2008	(England)	FW	Jermain Defoe	Tottenham Hotspur	£9,000,000

=== Out ===
Date	Nation	Position	Name	To	Transfer Fee
4 July 2007	(Bulgaria)	FW	Svetoslav Todorov	Charlton Athletic	Free Transfer
12 August 2007	(Democratic Republic of the Congo)	FW	Lomana LuaLua	Olympiacos	£2,800,000
13 August 2007	(Republic of Ireland)	DF	Andy O'Brien	Bolton Wanderers	Undisclosed
24 August 2007	(England)	FW	Andy Cole	Sunderland	Free Transfer
31 August 2007	(England)	MF	Gary O'Neil	Middlesbrough	£5,000,000
31 August 2007	(Serbia)	DF	Dejan Stefanović	Fulham	£1,000,000
17 January 2008	(England)	MF	Matthew Taylor	Bolton Wanderers	Undisclosed
5 February 2008	(Zimbabwe)	FW	Benjani Mwaruwari	Manchester City	£3,870,000

=== Loans In ===
Date	Nation	Position	Name	From	Length
18 January 2008	(France)	DF	Lucien Aubey	RC Lens	Until end of season
27 January 2008	(Czech Republic)	FW	Milan Baroš	Olympique Lyon	Until end of season

=== Loans Out ===
Date	Nation	Position	Name	To	Length
10 August 2007	(Canada)	GK	Asmir Begovic	AFC Bournemouth	Until January (recalled 11 October)
10 August 2007	(France)	MF	Jean-François Christophe	AFC Bournemouth	Until January
21 September 2007	(Republic of Ireland)	DF	Marc Wilson	AFC Bournemouth	One Month
8 October 2007	(England)	DF	Martin Cranie	Queens Park Rangers	Three Months (ended 7 November)
15 November 2007	(Republic of Ireland)	DF	Marc Wilson	Luton Town	One Month
18 January 2008	(Mali)	DF	Djimi Traore	Stade Rennais	Until end of season
11 March 2008	(France)	MF	Jean-François Christophe	Yeovil Town	One Month

== Competitions ==
=== Premier League ===
==== Results ====
Matchday	1	2	3	4	5	6	7	8	9	10	11	12	13	14	15	16	17	18	19	20	21	22	23	24	25	26	27	28	29	30	31	32	33	34	35	36	37	38
Ground	A	H	H	A	A	H	A	H	A	A	H	A	H	A	H	A	H	A	H	H	A	A	H	A	H	A	H	A	H	H	A	H	A	H	A	H	A	H
Result	D	D	W	L	L	D	W	W	W	W	D	W	D	W	D	W	L	L	D	L	W	L	W	L	D	W	W	L	W	W	L	W	W	D	L	L	L	L
Position	10	11	5	9	13	15	10	7	6	5	7	5	7	6	6	5	7	7	7	8	8	9	8	9	9	8	7	9	7	6	6	6	6	6	7	7	8	8

Source: WorldFootball.com
A = Away; H = Home; W = Win; D = Draw; L = Loss

11 August 2007 1	Derby County	2–2	Portsmouth	Derby, Derbyshire
	Oakley 5'; Todd 84'	Report	Benjani 27'; Utaka 83'	Stadium: Pride Park Stadium; Attendance: 32,176; Referee: Mike Dean

15 August 2007 2	Portsmouth	1–1	Manchester United	Portsmouth, Hampshire
19:45	Benjani 53'; Muntari (yellow card) 54', (yellow card) 83' (yellow-red card); Davis (yellow card) 86'	Report	Scholes 15'; Ronaldo (red card) 85'; Vidić (yellow card) 86'	Stadium: Fratton Park; Attendance: 20,510; Referee: Steve Bennett

18 August 2007 3	Portsmouth	3–1	Bolton Wanderers	Portsmouth, Hampshire
12:45 BST	Kanu 16'; Utaka 30'; Taylor 88' (pen.)	Report	Anelka 12'	Stadium: Fratton Park; Attendance: 17,108; Referee: Steve Tanner

25 August 2007 4	Chelsea	1–0	Portsmouth	Fulham, London
15:00 BST	Lampard 31'	Report	Davis (yellow card) 52'; Muntari (yellow card) 77'	Stadium: Stamford Bridge; Attendance: 41,501; Referee: Alan Wiley

2 September 2007 5	Arsenal	3–1	Portsmouth	Islington, London
13:30 BST	Adebayor 8' (pen.); Fàbregas 35'; Senderos (red card) 49'; Rosický 59'	Report	Kanu 60'	Stadium: Emirates Stadium; Attendance: 60,114; Referee: Mark Halsey

15 September 2007 6	Portsmouth	0–0	Liverpool	Portsmouth, Hampshire
12:45 BST	Bouba Diop (yellow card) 29'; Johnson (yellow card) 64'; Davis (yellow card) 90+3'	Report	Alonso (yellow card) 31'; Sissoko (yellow card) 76'	Stadium: Fratton Park; Attendance: 20,388; Referee: Mike Riley

23 September 2007 7	Blackburn Rovers	0–1	Portsmouth	Blackburn, Lancashire
15:00 BST		Report	Kanu 25'	Stadium: Ewood Park; Attendance: 19,506; Referee: Chris Foy

29 September 2007 8	Portsmouth	7–4	Reading	Portsmouth, Hampshire
15:00 BST	Benjani 7', 37', 70'; Hreiðarsson 55'; Kranjčar 70'; Ingimarsson 81' (o.g.); Muntari 90+2' (pen.)	Report	Hunt 45'; Kitson 48'; Long 79'; Campbell 90+4' (o.g.)	Stadium: Fratton Park; Attendance: 20,102; Referee: Mark Halsey

7 October 2007 9	Fulham	0–2	Portsmouth	Fulham, London
16:10	Davis (yellow card) 21'	Report	Benjani 50'; Hreiðarsson 52'	Stadium: Craven Cottage; Attendance: 20,774; Referee: Howard Webb

20 October 2007 10	Wigan Athletic	0–2	Portsmouth	Wigan, Greater Manchester
		Report	Benjani 81'; Johnson 86'	Stadium: DW Stadium; Attendance: 17,695; Referee: Peter Walton

27 October 2007 11	Portsmouth	0–0	West Ham United	Portsmouth, Hampshire
17:15 BST		Report		Stadium: Fratton Park; Attendance: 20,525; Referee: Mike Dean

3 November 2007 12	Newcastle United	1–4	Portsmouth	Newcastle-upon-Tyne, Tyneside
	Campbell 16' (o.g.)	Report	Pamarot 8'; Benjani 9'; Utaka 11'; Kranjčar 71'	Stadium: St. James' Park; Attendance: 51,490; Referee: Chris Foy

11 November 2007 13	Portsmouth	0–0	Manchester City	Portsmouth, Hampshire
16:00		Report		Stadium: Fratton Park; Attendance: 19,529; Referee: Mark Halsey

24 November 2007 14	Birmingham City	0–2	Portsmouth	Birmingham, West Midlands
15:00 GMT		Report	Muntari 34'; Kranjčar 82'	Stadium: St. Andrew's; Attendance: 22,089; Referee: Martin Atkinson

1 December 2007 15	Portsmouth	0–0	Everton	Portsmouth, Hampshire
GMT		Report		Stadium: Fratton Park; Attendance: 20,102; Referee: Peter Walton

8 December 2007 16	Aston Villa	1–3	Portsmouth	Birmingham, West Midlands
12:45	Carew (yellow card) 4'; Berger (yellow card) 67'; Barry 72' (pen.)	Report	Gardner 10' (o.g.); Muntari 40', 61'; Mendes (yellow card) 43'; Johnson (yellow card) 68'; James (yellow card) 74'; Pamarot (yellow card) 75'; Kranjčar (yellow card) 80'	Stadium: Villa Park; Attendance: 35,790; Referee: Mike Riley

15 December 2007 17	Portsmouth	0–1	Tottenham Hotspur	Portsmouth, Hampshire
		Report	Berbatov 81'	Stadium: Fratton Park; Attendance: 20,520; Referee: Martin Atkinson

22 December 2007 18	Liverpool	4–1	Portsmouth	Liverpool, Merseyside
	Benayoun 13'; Distin 16' (o.g.); Torres 67', 85'	Report	Benjani 57'	Stadium: Anfield; Attendance: 43,071; Referee: Mike Riley

26 December 2007 19	Portsmouth	0–0	Arsenal	Portsmouth, Hampshire
19:45 GMT		Report		Stadium: Fratton Park; Attendance: 20,556; Referee: Steve Bennett

29 December 2007 20	Portsmouth	0–1	Middlesbrough	Portsmouth, Hampshire
		Report	Tuncay 20'	Stadium: Fratton Park; Attendance: 20,089; Referee: Alan Wiley

1 January 2008 21	Reading	0–2	Portsmouth	Reading, Berkshire
15:00 GMT	Sonko (red card) 3'	Report	Campbell 9'; Utaka 66'	Stadium: Majewski Stadium; Attendance: 24,084; Referee: Mike Dean

13 January 2008 22	Sunderland	2–0	Portsmouth	Sunderland
	Richardson 33', 44'	Report		Stadium: Stadium of Light; Attendance: 37,369; Referee: Chris Foy

19 January 2008 23	Portsmouth	3–1	Derby County	Portsmouth, Hampshire
	Benjani 38', 42', 55'	Report	Nyatanga 4'	Stadium: Fratton Park; Attendance: 19,401; Referee: Mike Dean

30 January 2008 24	Manchester United	2–0	Portsmouth	Trafford, Greater Manchester
	Ronaldo 10', 13'	Report		Stadium: Old Trafford; Attendance: 75,415; Referee: Martin Atkinson

2 February 2008 25	Portsmouth	1–1	Chelsea	Portsmouth, Hampshire
15:00 GMT	Defoe 64'	Report	Anelka 55'	Stadium: Fratton Park; Attendance: 20,488; Referee: Howard Webb

9 February 2008 26	Bolton Wanderers	0–1	Portsmouth	Bolton, Greater Manchester
15:00 GMT		[news.bbc.co.uk/sport2/hi/football/eng_prem/7223964.stm Report]	Diarra 81'	Stadium: Reebok Stadium; Attendance: 18,544; Referee: Peter Walton

2 February 2008 27	Portsmouth	1–0	Sunderland	Portsmouth, Hampshire
	Defoe 69' (pen.)	Report		Stadium: Fratton Park; Attendance: 20,139; Referee: Phil Dowd

2 March 2008 28	Everton	3–1	Portsmouth	Liverpool, Merseyside
	Yakubu 1', 81'; Cahill 73'	Report	Defoe 38'	Stadium: Goodison Park; Attendance: 33,938; Referee: Andre Marriner

12 March 2008 29	Portsmouth	4–2	Birmingham City	Portsmouth, Hampshire
19:45 GMT	Defoe 6' (pen.), 9'; Hreiðarsson 49'; Kanu 90'	Report	Muamba 10'; Larsson 40'	Stadium: Fratton Park; Attendance: 20,138; Referee: Steve Tanner

15 March 2008 30	Portsmouth	2–0	Aston Villa	Portsmouth, Hampshire
	Defoe 11'; Reo-Coker 38' (o.g.)	Report		Stadium: Fratton Park; Attendance: 20,388; Referee: Chris Foy

22 March 2008 31	Tottenham Hotspur	2–0	Portsmouth	Haringey, London
	Bent 30'; O'Hara 82'	Report		Stadium: White Hart Lane; Attendance: 35,998; Referee: Phil Dowd

29 March 2008 32	Portsmouth	2–0	Wigan Athletic	Portsmouth, Hampshire
	Defoe 32', 90'	Report		Stadium: Fratton Park; Attendance: 18,623; Referee: Alan Wiley

8 April 2008 33	West Ham United	0–1	Portsmouth	London
19:45 BST		Report	Kranjčar 61'	Stadium: Upton Park; Attendance: 33,629; Referee: Lee Probert

12 April 2008 34	Portsmouth	0–0	Newcastle United	Portsmouth, Hampshire
		Report		Stadium: Fratton Park; Attendance: 20,507; Referee: Phil Dowd

20 April 2008 35	Manchester City	3–1	Portsmouth	Manchester, Greater Manchester
16:00	Vassell 11'; Petrov 13'; Benjani 74'	Report	Utaka 24'	Stadium: City of Manchester Stadium; Attendance: 40,205; Referee: Andre Marriner

27 April 2008 36	Portsmouth	0–1	Blackburn Rovers	Portsmouth, Hampshire
13:30		Report	Santa Cruz 74'	Stadium: Fratton Park; Attendance: 18,722; Referee: Mike Riley

3 May 2008 37	Middlesbrough	2–0	Portsmouth	Middlesbrough, North Yorkshire
	Riggott 40'; Tuncay 53'	Report		Stadium: Riverside Stadium; Attendance: 24,828; Referee: Peter Walton

11 May 2008 38	Portsmouth	0–1	Fulham	Portsmouth, Hampshire
15:00		Report	Murphy 76'	Stadium: Fratton Park; Attendance: 20,532; Referee: Mark Clattenburg

==== Table ====
Pos	Team	Pld	W	D	L	GF	GA	GD	Pts	Qualification or relegation
6	Aston Villa	38	16	12	10	71	51	+20	60	Qualification for the Intertoto Cup third round
7	Blackburn Rovers	38	15	13	10	50	48	+2	58	
8	Portsmouth	38	16	9	13	48	40	+8	57	Qualification for the UEFA Cup first round (Note: As FA Cup winners)
9	Manchester City	38	15	10	13	45	53	−8	55	Qualification for the UEFA Cup first qualifying round (Note: Manchester City qualified as the highest-ranked team not already qualified for European competitions of Premier League Fair Play Ranking by The Football Association, the top association among UEFA Fair Play ranking winners.)
10	West Ham United	38	13	10	15	42	50	−8	49	

Source: Barclays Premier League
Rules for classification: 1) points; 2) goal difference; 3) number of goals scored.
For further information on European qualification see Premier League – Competition

=== FA Cup ===
Opposing Team	For	Against	Date	Venue	Round
Ipswich Town	1	0	5 January 2008	Portman Road, Ipswich	Third round
Plymouth Argyle	2	1	26 January 2008	Fratton Park, Portsmouth	Fourth round
Preston North End	1	0	17 February 2008	Deepdale, Preston	Fifth round
Manchester United	1	0	8 March 2008	Old Trafford, Manchester	Sixth round
West Bromwich Albion	1	0	5 April 2008	Wembley Stadium, London	Semi-final
Cardiff City (Wales)	1	0	17 May 2008	Wembley Stadium, London	Final

=== League Cup ===
Opposing Team	For	Against	Date	Venue	Round
Leeds United	3	1	28 August 2007	Fratton Park, Portsmouth	Second round
Burnley	1	0	25 September 2007	Turf Moor, Burnley	Third round
Blackburn Rovers	1	2	30 October 2007	Fratton Park, Portsmouth	Fourth round

== Statistics ==
=== Appearances and goals ===
No.	Pos	Nat	Player	Total		Premier League		FA Cup		League Cup	
No.	Pos	Nat	Player	Apps	Goals	Apps	Goals	Apps	Goals	Apps	Goals
Goalkeepers
1	GK	(England) ENG	David James	42	0	35	0	6	0	1	0
21	GK	(England) ENG	Jamie Ashdown	5	0	3	0	0	0	2	0
Defenders
3	DF	(France) FRA	Lucien Aubey	3	0	1+2	0	0	0	0	0
4	DF	(Cameroon) CMR	Lauren	18	0	11+4	0	1+1	0	1	0
5	DF	(England) ENG	Glen Johnson	36	1	29	1	6	0	1	0
7	DF	(Iceland) ISL	Hermann Hreiðarsson	39	3	30+2	3	6	0	0+1	0
15	DF	(France) FRA	Sylvain Distin	45	0	36	0	6	0	3	0
16	DF	(France) FRA	Noé Pamarot	22	3	14+4	1	1	0	3	2
20	DF	(England) ENG	Martin Cranie	3	0	1+1	0	0	0	1	0
23	DF	(England) ENG	Sol Campbell	37	1	31	1	5	0	1	0
Midfielders
6	MF	(France) FRA	Lassana Diarra	17	2	11+1	1	5	1	0	0
8	MF	(Senegal) SEN	Papa Bouba Diop	32	0	25	0	4+1	0	1+1	0
11	MF	(Ghana) GHA	Sulley Muntari	33	5	27+2	4	4	1	0	0
18	MF	(Democratic Republic of the Congo) COD	Arnold Mvuemba	12	0	3+5	0	1+1	0	1+1	0
19	MF	(Croatia) CRO	Niko Kranjčar	42	5	31+3	4	6	1	2	0
22	MF	(Scotland) SCO	Richard Hughes	17	0	8+5	0	0+2	0	2	0
28	MF	(England) ENG	Sean Davis	25	0	18+4	0	0+2	0	1	0
30	MF	(Portugal) POR	Pedro Mendes	24	0	14+4	0	3	0	3	0
34	MF	(France) FRA	Frank Songo'o	1	0	0+1	0	0	0	0	0
Forwards
9	FW	(Czech Republic) CZE	Milan Baroš	16	0	8+4	0	1+3	0	0	0
10	FW	(England) ENG	David Nugent	22	3	5+10	0	1+3	1	2+1	2
14	FW	(England) ENG	Jermain Defoe	12	8	12	8	0	0	0	0
17	FW	(Nigeria) NGR	John Utaka	36	5	25+4	5	4	0	2+1	0
27	FW	(Nigeria) NGR	Nwankwo Kanu	31	7	13+12	4	5	2	0+1	1
Players transferred out during the season
6	DF	(Mali) MLI	Djimi Traoré	5	0	1+2	0	0	0	2	0
14	MF	(England) ENG	Matthew Taylor	15	1	3+10	1	0	0	1+1	0
25	FW	(Zimbabwe) ZIM	Benjani	27	12	21+2	12	1	0	3	0
26	MF	(England) ENG	Gary O'Neil	3	0	2	0	0	0	0+1	0

Last updated: 31 May 2018
Source: Competitions

=== Top scorers ===
==== Premier League ====
- (Zimbabwe) Benjani – 12
- (England) Jermain Defoe – 7
- (Ghana) Sulley Muntari – 4
- (Croatia) Niko Kranjčar – 3
- (Nigeria) Nwankwo Kanu – 3
- (Nigeria) John Utaka – 3
