= Mickaël Castejon =

French footballer (born 1985)

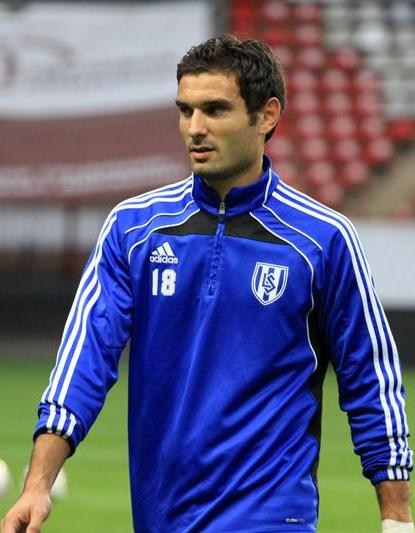
- Castejon with Lausanne-Sport

Personal information
- Date of birth: 21 March 1985 (age 41)
- Place of birth: Libourne, France
- Height: 1.84 m (6 ft 0 in)
- Position: Goalkeeper

Youth career
- 2001–2002: Libourne
- 2002–2005: Auxerre

Senior career*
Years	Team	Apps	(Gls)
2006–2007	Stade Auxerre		
2007–2009	Baulmes	28	(0)
2009–2010	Lausanne-Ouchy	29	(0)
2010–2011	Lausanne-Sport	3	(0)
2011–?	Lausanne-Ouchy		
- * Club domestic league appearances and goals

Mickaël Castejon (born 21 March 1985) is a French former professional footballer who played as a goalkeeper.
