= Damien Dufour =

French footballer (born 1981)

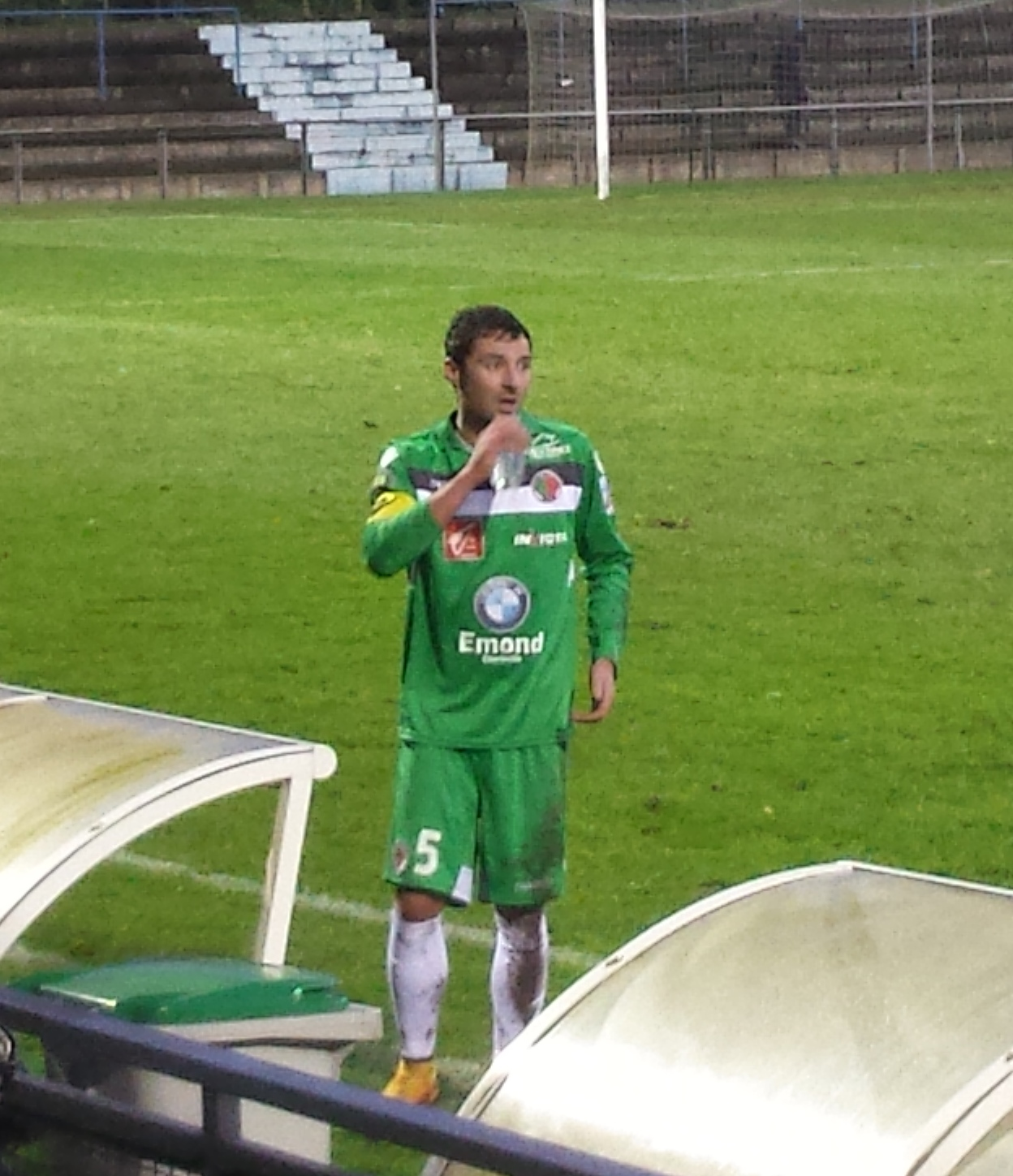
- Dufour in 2015

Personal information
- Date of birth: October 30, 1981 (age 45)
- Place of birth: Migennes, France
- Height: 1.90 m (6 ft 3 in)
- Position: Midfielder

Team information
- Current team: Auxerre B

Youth career
- Auxerre

Senior career*
Years	Team	Apps	(Gls)
2001–2010	Auxerre B		
2004–2005	Auxerre	1	(0)
2007–2008	→ Grenoble (loan)	14	(1)
2010–2011	Châteauroux	3	(1)
2011–2013	Auxerre B	59	(3)
2013–2015	Sedan	49	(4)
2015–2020	Prix-lès-Mézières	66	(3)
- * Club domestic league appearances and goals

Damien Dufour (born October 30, 1981) is a French former professional footballer who played as a midfielder.

== Career ==
Dufour was born in Migennes. He played the 2007–08 season for Grenoble on loan from Auxerre.
