= Jermain Defoe =

English footballer (born 1982)

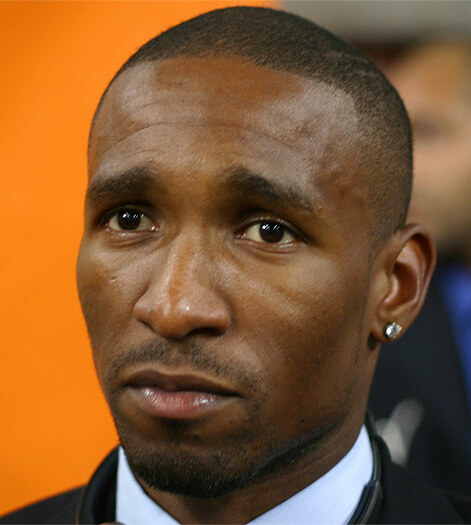
- Defoe in 2009

Personal information
- Full name: Jermain Colin Defoe
- Date of birth: 7 October 1982 (age 44)
- Place of birth: Beckton, England
- Height: 5 ft 7 in (1.70 m)
- Position: Striker

Youth career
- Senrab
- 1997–1999: Charlton Athletic
- 1999: West Ham United

Senior career*
Years	Team	Apps	(Gls)
1999–2004	West Ham United	93	(29)
2000–2001	→ AFC Bournemouth (loan)	29	(18)
2004–2008	Tottenham Hotspur	139	(43)
2008	→ Portsmouth (loan)	1	(1)
2008–2009	Portsmouth	30	(14)
2009–2014	Tottenham Hotspur	135	(47)
2014–2015	Toronto FC	19	(11)
2014	→ Tottenham Hotspur (loan)	2	(1)
2015–2017	Sunderland	87	(34)
2017–2020	AFC Bournemouth	28	(4)
2019–2020	→ Rangers (loan)	37	(21)
2020–2022	Rangers	17	(4)
2022	Sunderland	7	(0)
Total		624	(227)

International career
	England U16	8	(0)
2000–2001	England U18	7	(0)
2001–2003	England U21	23	(7)
2004–2017	England	57	(20)

Managerial career
- 2026: Woking
- * Club domestic league appearances and goals

Jermain Colin Defoe OBE (born 7 October 1982) is an English football coach and former professional player. He was most recently the manager of National League club Woking.

Defoe was a striker and began his career with Charlton Athletic, joining their youth team aged 14, before moving to West Ham United aged 16 and rising through the ranks. He made his first-team debut for West Ham in 2000 at 18 years and 21 days, and, after a season-long loan spell at AFC Bournemouth during the 2000–01 season, established himself in the West Ham line-up. After West Ham's relegation in 2003, a move to Tottenham Hotspur in January 2004 soon followed, where Defoe played for four years before being sold to Portsmouth in January 2008. He spent one season at Fratton Park before returning to Tottenham in the January 2009 transfer window. He left for Toronto FC of Major League Soccer (MLS) in 2014, before returning to England in January 2015 to sign for Sunderland where he stayed until the club was relegated from the Premier League in 2017. Following a brief spell at AFC Bournemouth in 2017, Defoe joined Scottish side Rangers in 2018 on loan. The move was later made permanent. At his new club he was involved in winning the 2020–21 league title. This was the first and only league title in his career at the age of 38.

In April 2011, Defoe became the 20th player to score a century of Premier League goals, and is currently the tenth-highest goalscorer in Premier League history with 162 goals as well as the sixth-highest goalscorer in Tottenham's history. Defoe also holds the Premier League record for the most goals scored as a substitute, with 24. On 19 November 2016, Defoe scored his 150th Premier League goal, becoming the joint tenth-highest goal scorer in Premier League history.

Defoe debuted for the England national team in 2004 after representing England at youth level, earning 57 senior caps and scoring 20 goals, including three appearances and a goal at the 2010 FIFA World Cup.

== Early life ==
Defoe was born in Beckton, east London. He was born to a Dominican father and his mother is of Saint Lucian descent. Defoe attended St Joachim Primary School in Custom House, London and St Bonaventure's in Forest Gate, London.

Defoe grew up in Canning Town and when his family moved to Beckton, played five-a-side football at Newham Leisure Centre. He joined the Sunday league team Senrab, well known in London for producing players such as Lee Bowyer, John Terry, Ashley Cole and Ledley King, and then joined the FA National School of Excellence at Lilleshall, Shropshire, as a 14-year-old in 1997. While there, he attended Idsall School.

== Club career ==
=== West Ham United ===
Defoe was spotted playing football by Charlton Athletic who enrolled him at the FA National School of Excellence at Lilleshall Hall in 1997. Two years later, he took the controversial decision, aged 16, to turn professional with West Ham United, following which Charlton were subsequently awarded compensation rising to £1.4 million contingent on Defoe's Premier League and international appearances. At West Ham, he was a member of the Under-19 team that won the Premier Academy League title in 1999–2000, scoring twice against Arsenal in the play-off final.

Defoe made his first-team debut in a League Cup match against Walsall in September 2000, scoring in a 1–0 win. Shortly thereafter, he joined Second Division club AFC Bournemouth on a near season-long loan, where he scored in ten consecutive matches, equalling John Aldridge's and Clarrie Jordan's post-war record. He scored 18 goals in 29 league appearances for Bournemouth. West Ham manager Harry Redknapp tipped him for stardom, saying, "He's done great. I sent him out to Bournemouth to get some experience playing league football and he's coped marvellously. To score 10 goals in 10 games is a terrific achievement. He's a bright lad who's full of confidence. Nothing knocks him, he's a typical goal-scorer. If he misses, he'll be there the next time looking for a goal. He's a kid with a big future."

Defoe finished as West Ham's top scorer in the 2001–02 season despite being used primarily as a substitute by manager Glenn Roeder, scoring 14 goals in 39 league and cup appearances, one of which was a 1–0 away win against Manchester United in December 2001, as West Ham finished seventh in the Premier League. He scored a further 11 goals in 42 league and cup appearances in 2002–03 but was unable to prevent West Ham from being relegated.

Less than 24 hours after the club had been relegated, Defoe made a written request for a transfer, saying, "As much as I love West Ham United I feel that now is the right time for me to move on in my career. This is very much a career decision. I am very ambitious and hungry to achieve at the highest levels of the game for both club and country." The timing of his request, however, drew criticism from both fans and teammates and was turned down by the club. He later apologised to supporters, saying, "I mishandled that move and I can only apologise. I'm young and I've learned from it. I still played my hardest for West Ham and gave them 100% and want to thank the fans for their support."

Defoe began 2003–04 with West Ham but a refusal to sign a new contract and disciplinary problems, including three sendings-off, which saw him play only 22 matches out of a possible 34, led to West Ham accepting an offer from Tottenham Hotspur for him in the January transfer window.

=== Tottenham Hotspur ===
Defoe joined Tottenham in February 2004 for an initial fee of £6 million, rising to £7 million depending on "specific performance criteria", and with Bobby Zamora joining West Ham. Manager David Pleat said, "I can't think of a British striker at his age who has achieved as much in such a short space of time. His goal record for a 21-year-old is quite exceptional. I hope he will have a fine career at Tottenham." Defoe marked his arrival at Tottenham with a goal on his debut in the 4–3 home win over Portsmouth in February 2004 and added a further six in the remainder of 2003–04, scoring 7 goals in 15 matches. He then scored 13 goals in 36 matches in the Premier League, including a hat-trick in a 5–1 win over Southampton in December 2004, and nine goals in eight matches in the FA Cup and League Cup, in 2004–05. He also received the club's Player of the Year award for the 2004 calendar year, as voted by season ticket holders and Spurs members. Despite speculation linking him with other clubs, Defoe signed a new four-and-a-half-year contract with Tottenham in April 2005. The following season was not as profitable for Defoe, and Spurs manager Martin Jol used Defoe in rotation with Robbie Keane, Dimitar Berbatov and Mido providing the competition for a starting position. Defoe started 23 times and came on as substitute 13 times, scoring nine goals.

Defoe made 49 league and cup appearances for Tottenham, scoring 18 goals, during 2006–07 as Tottenham competed in the UEFA Cup as well as the domestic competitions. He appeared to bite West Ham player Javier Mascherano on the shoulder during Tottenham's 1–0 win over West Ham in October 2006, sparking a melee between players of both teams. The FA declined to take action against Defoe as the referee, Steve Bennett, had booked Defoe for the incident. Defoe scored his 50th goal for Tottenham in the 2–1 win over Aston Villa on Boxing Day in December 2006, in which he scored both goals, and scored in Tottenham's 2–0 win over Charlton in May 2007, which condemned his former club to relegation to the Championship. During the summer of 2007, there was speculation about Defoe's future at Tottenham following the arrival of Darren Bent for a fee of £16.5 million. However, Defoe insisted that he would stay at Tottenham and fight for his place, saying, "I'm really excited about the new season and the prospect of another campaign in Europe. We have made some good signings and are now stronger and better equipped to compete in all competitions."

On 20 September 2007, Defoe came on as a substitute against Cypriot club Anorthosis Famagusta to score twice in a 6–1 win, his first goals of the season. On 25 November 2007, he missed a penalty against former club West Ham at the Boleyn Ground in added time which would have won the match for Spurs; the match finished 1–1.

=== Portsmouth ===
Defoe joined Portsmouth in January 2008 for £7.5 million. He scored the equalising goal on his debut, a 1–1 draw at home to Chelsea. In March 2008, he was unable to play against Tottenham as the Premier League ruled that he was ineligible to do so as he was initially signed on loan in January 2008. In Portsmouth's match against Wigan Athletic the following week, he scored twice; in so doing, he became the first ever Portsmouth player to score in his first five home matches. Due to appearances in Tottenham's third and fourth round ties, Defoe found himself cup-tied for all the subsequent matches of Pompey's successful 2007–08 FA Cup campaign. This also meant that he missed out on playing in Spurs' League Cup final victory over Chelsea, however he still received his winners' medal, albeit 10 years later, in December 2018. Defoe ended 2007–08 with eight goals in 12 appearances for Portsmouth.

Defoe scored Portsmouth's first goal of 2008–09 on 30 August 2008 with the opener in a 3–0 win at Everton, and then scored their first home goals on 13 September with a brace against Middlesbrough. Five days later, he contributed a goal and an assist in Pompey's first ever major European match, a 2–0 UEFA Cup first round win over Portuguese club Vitória de Guimarães on 18 September.

=== Return to Tottenham ===
In January 2009, Portsmouth chairman Peter Storrie revealed Defoe's intentions to leave the club in the near future. This came after joining the club only in the same transfer window of the previous year. It was reported that Defoe's former club Tottenham made a formal approach for the striker, but no agreement was reached; Spurs manager Harry Redknapp described the clubs as "miles apart in their valuation of the player", suggesting that Portsmouth wanted "in excess of £20 million". After negotiations, Portsmouth accepted a bid from Tottenham thought to be around £15.75 million (including fees owed to Tottenham for the previous transfers of Younès Kaboul and Pedro Mendes and waiving a £4 million sell-on clause that had also been negotiated during his transfer from Spurs to Portsmouth) on 6 January 2009. The player had agreed to a five-year contract and was confirmed as a Tottenham player by his new club on 9 January 2009. Defoe was presented at White Hart Lane with a carnival atmosphere before the start of Spurs' League Cup clash against Burnley after his return to White Hart Lane.

==== 2008–09 season ====
Defoe made his return debut on 11 January 2009 in a Premier League match against Wigan Athletic. He scored his first goal against former club Portsmouth at White Hart Lane on 18 January 2009, in a match which finished 1–1. He also scored his team's second goal in the League Cup semi-final second leg loss at Burnley, which helped Spurs book a place in the final with a 6–4 aggregate win. He scored three goals in his first four matches before suffering a broken foot which meant that he returned for Spurs against Newcastle United on 19 April in which the club won 1–0. This injury meant he missed Spurs' appearance in the 2009 Football League Cup Final. He scored his first goal since his return from injury in a 2–1 win against Manchester City and helped his team secure eighth place in the league.

==== 2009–10 season ====
On 19 August 2009, Defoe scored his first hat-trick for Tottenham in a 5–1 away victory over Hull City in the second match of the 2009–10 Premier League. Following the match, his manager Harry Redknapp stated his high opinion of Defoe: "With [Cristiano] Ronaldo gone, he can push to be the [Premier League] top scorer." After a fine run of form which saw him score seven goals for club and country, Defoe was named Premier League Player of the Month for August 2009. On 12 September 2009, Defoe scored after 38 seconds with an overhead kick against 2008–09 Premier League champions Manchester United in a match which ended in a 3–1 loss for Tottenham, taking his tally for the 2009–10 league season to five goals in five matches. On 23 September 2009, Defoe scored a header during Tottenham's 5–1 win over Preston. Defoe scored a goal and was sent off during the match against his former club, Portsmouth.

Defoe scored five goals at White Hart Lane in a 9–1 thrashing of Wigan on 22 November 2009. This included the second-fastest hat-trick in Premier League history, which was scored in seven minutes. In doing so, Defoe became only the third player to score five goals in one Premier League match, after Alan Shearer and Andy Cole. Dimitar Berbatov and Sergio Agüero have subsequently equalled this feat. After the match, Harry Redknapp further asserted his belief that Defoe would go on to be the Premier League's top scorer in 2009–10. Redknapp later said that although Wayne Rooney is the best all-round attacking player, Defoe is the best finisher in England and should be a regular for the England national team. On 3 February, Defoe claimed his third hat-trick of the season in an FA Cup fourth-round replay against Leeds United at Elland Road, with Spurs winning 3–1. His rich vein of form continued on 21 February with another goal in the Premier League, against Wigan. Defoe's next goal was a penalty in Tottenham's win against Chelsea, which itself followed a famous 2–1 win over Arsenal. This took his tally to 24 goals for the season.

==== 2010–11 season ====
Defoe played his part in Tottenham qualifying for the UEFA Champions League group stage, thanks to a controversial goal against Young Boys, where he appeared to use his arm before scoring the second goal of the match, which finished 4–0 to Tottenham. He was injured in the beginning of September when he was on duty with England, He made his comeback in Tottenham's 3–2 victory against Arsenal in the North London derby. He won a header which started the attack in which Gareth Bale scored five minutes in the second half to begin the comeback from 2–0 down to a 3–2 victory.

On 26 December 2010, Defoe received a straight red card, his first of the season and first since 17 October 2009, in a match at Aston Villa; his team leading at the time went on to secure the win despite playing over an hour with ten men. Defoe began Tottenham's 2010–11 FA Cup campaign with a brace of goals in the third round match at home to Charlton Athletic on 9 January 2011, with Spurs winning 3–0, but in the following round, they were defeated by Fulham.

In the 2010–11 Premier League, Defoe scored his first league goals of the season on 6 March 2011 against Wolverhampton Wanderers, getting the first two for Spurs in a 3–3 draw. He scored his third goal of the 2010–11 season with a long-range shot with his left foot against West Bromwich Albion. This was a triple landmark for Defoe, as it was his 100th Premier League goal as well as his 100th goal scored as a Tottenham player. In addition, it signified the 1,000th goal scored for Tottenham in the Premier League era.

==== 2011–12 season ====
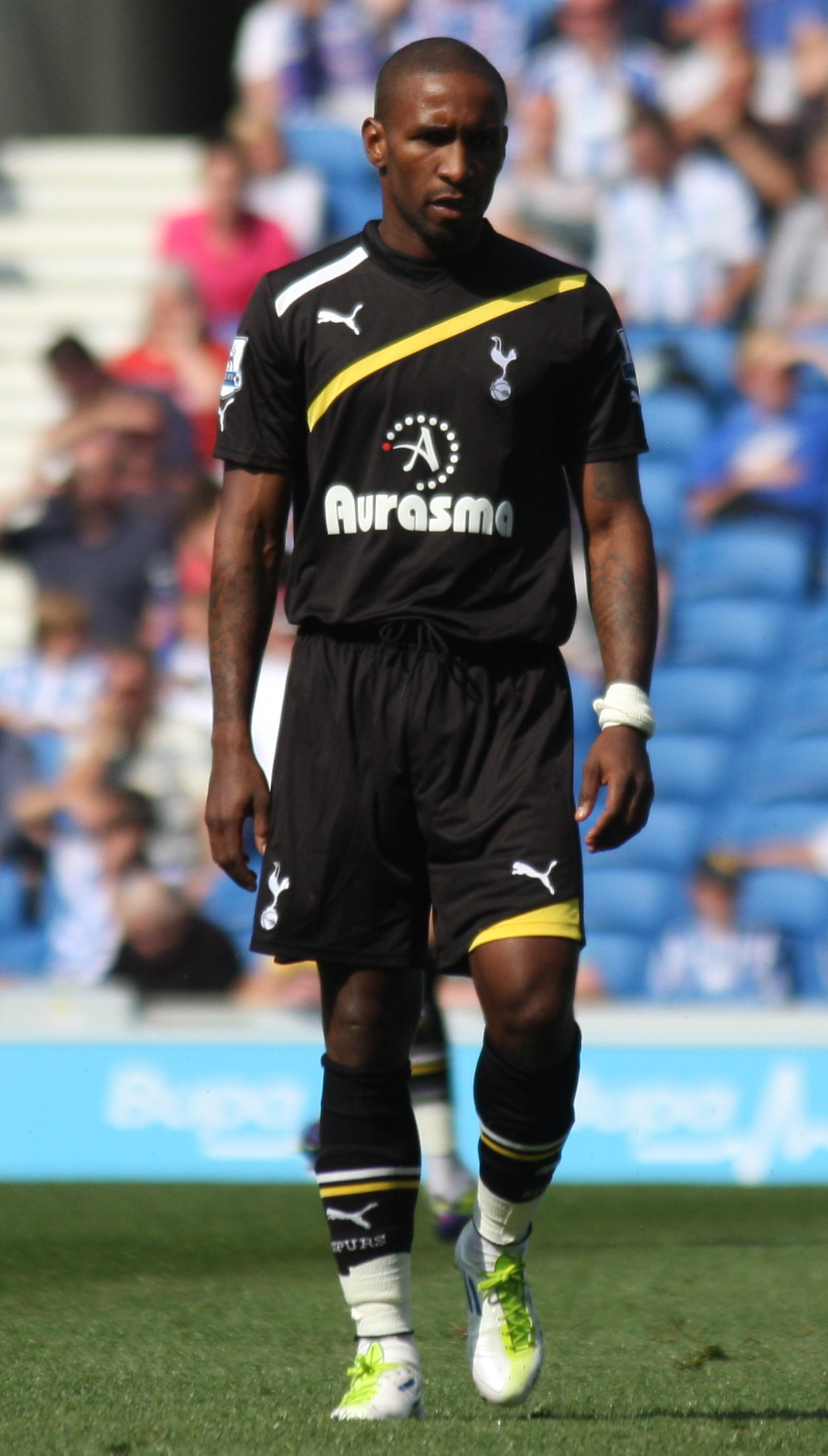
Defoe playing for Tottenham Hotspur in 2011

In pre-season, Defoe scored two goals, one coming in a 3–0 win against Orlando Pirates on 23 July, and the other in a 2–1 win against Athletic Bilbao at White Hart Lane on 6 August. Defoe started 2011–12 by scoring in a 5–0 win against Hearts in a UEFA Europa League play-off match on 18 August. His first Premier League goal of the season came in a 2–0 win at Wolves, scoring the second goal after exchanging passes with Niko Kranjčar. Defoe's first goal of 2012 came in a 1–0 home win against West Brom, converting a Gareth Bale cross. He scored on the last day of the season against Fulham, the second in a 2–0 win. Defoe ended the season with 17 goals in 38 matches across all competitions; in the Premier League, he scored 11 in 25 appearances, of which only 11 were starts.

==== 2012–13 season ====
Defoe started by scoring on the opening day of the 2012–13 Premier League against Newcastle United in a 2–1 defeat. On 30 August 2012, Defoe signed a new three-year contract with Tottenham. He scored the 200th goal of his club career in a 4–2 defeat to Chelsea on 20 October and on 8 November, he scored a hat-trick in a 3–1 win against Slovenian club Maribor in the Europa League. In doing so, he overtook Teddy Sheringham on Tottenham's all-time goalscorers list. On 21 April 2013, Defoe scored his 15th goal of the season in the home match against Manchester City, a 3–1 win. The goal took him level with Alan Gilzean in joint-seventh place on the all-time Tottenham scorers list.

==== 2013–14 season ====
Defoe started 2013–14 as a substitute, with newly signed striker Roberto Soldado starting for Tottenham. Nonetheless, manager André Villas-Boas used him as a first-choice striker for their opening matches in the Europa League, and on 29 August he scored his first goals of the campaign in a 3–0 home win against Dinamo Tbilisi. The result took Tottenham through to the group stages via an 8–0 aggregate victory after winning 5–0 in the first leg.

On 19 September, Defoe scored twice in a 3–0 victory against Tromsø in the Europa League group stages, taking his tally in Europe to within two goals of the record holder, Martin Chivers. On 24 September 2013, Defoe scored another two in a 4–0 win against Aston Villa in the League Cup, which took his tally for Tottenham to 139 goals, moving him past George Hunt as the club's fifth-highest scorer of all time. His goal on 3 October against Anzhi Makhachkala in a 2–0 win took him to one short of the club's all-time record of 22 held by Chivers. Two further goals, against Sheriff Tiraspol in two consecutive fixtures in the Europa League, saw Defoe with 23 European goals, one more than Chivers' previous record as Tottenham's highest European goalscorer. Defoe said Chivers had been at the match and had encouraged him to beat his record.

=== Toronto FC ===
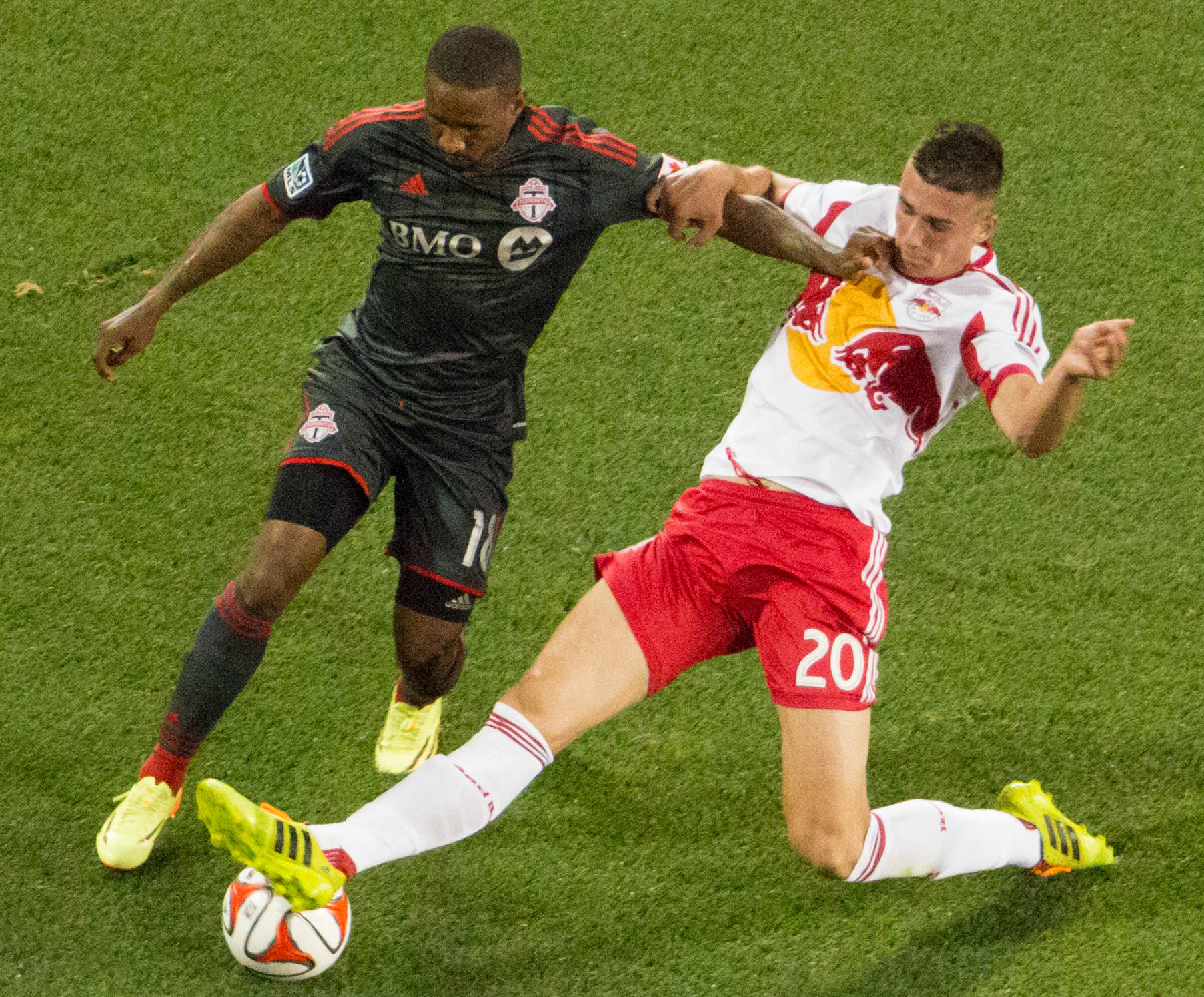
Defoe (left) playing for Toronto in 2014

On 10 January 2014, Tottenham announced that Defoe was leaving to join Major League Soccer (MLS) club Toronto FC, effective 28 February 2014. He agreed to a four-year deal worth between £68,000–90,000 per week. Toronto began its pursuit of Defoe the previous October, when the team management – which included Defoe's ex-Tottenham teammate Ryan Nelsen – met with him in London, and he received phone calls from rapper Drake, a Toronto native. The transfer also included an agreement between Tottenham Hotspur and Toronto's owners, Maple Leaf Sports & Entertainment, involving marketing, merchandise and broadcast rights, as well as a friendly match during Tottenham's North American tour in July 2014. Defoe was immediately loaned back to Tottenham until the end of February 2014, with whom he made two more appearances as a substitute.

Defoe debuted with Toronto in their season opener at Seattle Sounders FC on 15 March 2014, scoring both goals in their 2–1 victory. On 31 August 2014, Toronto FC called a press conference to fire manager Nelsen; during the press conference, the general manager Tim Bezbatchenko was non-committal on Defoe's future at the club, implying that the player might be unsettled and that the club would entertain offers in excess of the £6 million paid for the striker. He said, "We're speaking with him [Defoe] and then we'll make a decision. We'll discuss it over the next 24 hours."

=== Sunderland ===
==== 2014–15 season ====
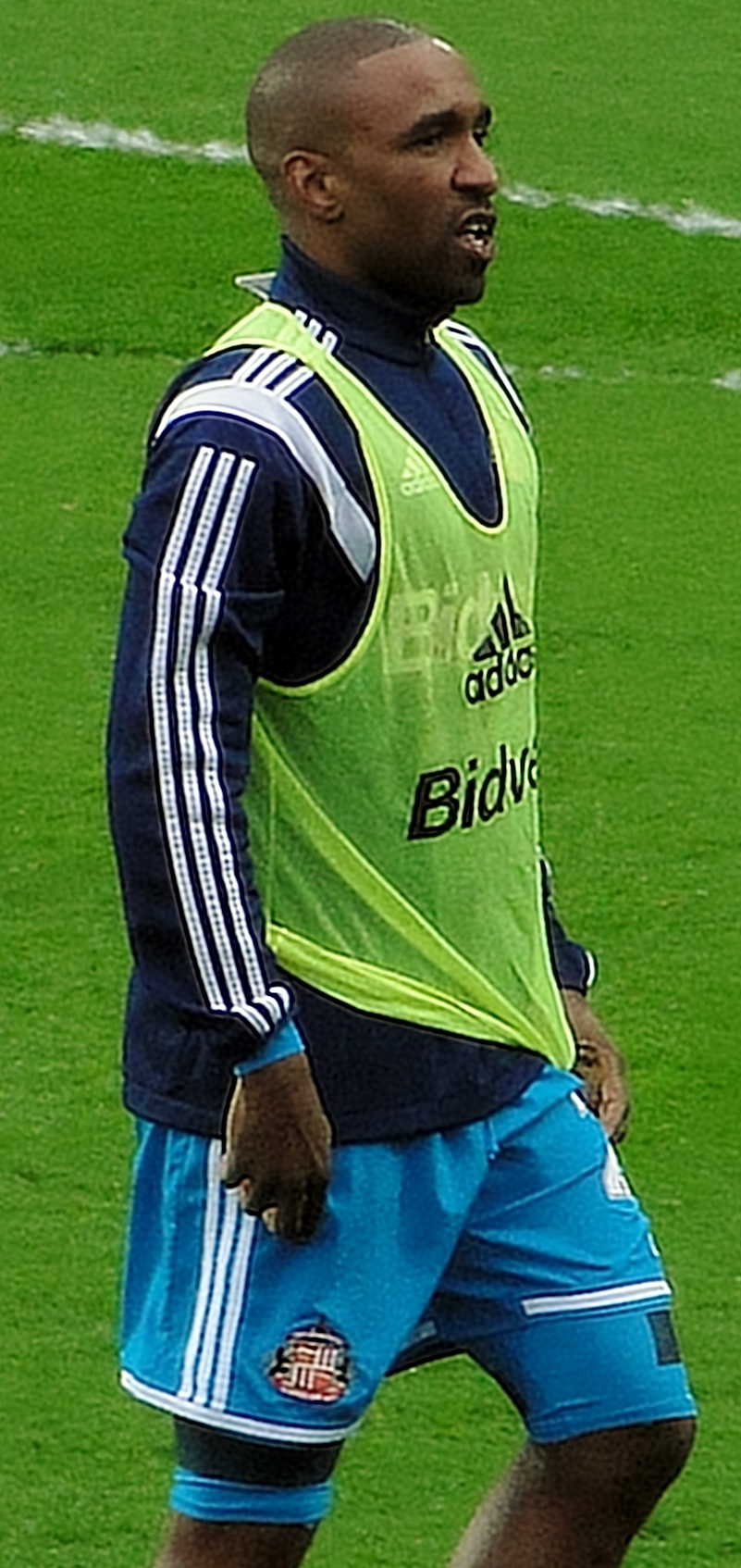
Defoe warming up for Sunderland in 2015

On 16 January 2015, Defoe joined Premier League club Sunderland after agreeing to a three-and-a-half-year deal, as part of a player exchange deal sending Jozy Altidore to Toronto FC, after completing only 11 months of his four-year deal with Toronto. He made his Sunderland debut the following day against former club Tottenham. Defoe started the match but was goalless when he was substituted after 75 minutes, ending his record of scoring on his first appearance for every club he has played for. Defoe scored his first Sunderland goal on his home debut in a 2–0 victory over Burnley on 31 January 2015. His second goal came the following week on 7 February 2015, where he scored the opening goal in a 1–1 draw away to Swansea City.

On 5 April, he scored the only goal in the Tyne–Wear derby victory over Newcastle with a 22-yard volley to end a sequence of eight matches without a win, and their first victory under the management of Dick Advocaat. The emotion of scoring the goal caused him to cry. On 9 May, Defoe scored his fourth goal of the season in a 2–0 win against Everton at Goodison Park, a result which moved Sunderland out of the relegation zone and gave Everton their first home defeat of 2015.

==== 2015–16 season ====
On the opening day of the 2015–16 Premier League, Defoe scored in a 4–2 loss at Leicester City, meaning he had scored in 15 Premier League seasons. On 25 August, he scored a hat-trick in a 6–3 home win over Exeter City in the second round of the League Cup. Defoe then scored twice in Sunderland's opening match of 2016, a 3–1 defeat of Aston Villa on 2 January. In the team's next league fixture, he scored a hat-trick against Swansea City in a 4–2 win at the Liberty Stadium. On 6 February, Defoe scored an 89th-minute equaliser against Liverpool as Sunderland came from 2–0 down to draw the match. On 16 March, Defoe opened the scoring away to Newcastle as the Tyne–Wear derby was drawn 1–1.

On 16 April 2016, Defoe scored Sunderland's second goal in a crucial 3–0 away victory over fellow strugglers Norwich, which left Sunderland one point from safety. On 7 May 2016, Defoe scored the winning goal against Chelsea, moving Sunderland out of the bottom three, and taking his Premier League tally to 15 for the season. Defoe was part of the Sunderland squad on the matchday when they secured their Premier League status with a 3–0 home win over Everton on 11 May 2016.

Defoe ended the season as Sunderland's top scorer with 15 league goals, and was also named the club's player of the season. On 9 June, Defoe signed a new contract with Sunderland, committing his future to the club until 2019.

==== 2016–17 season ====
On 13 August 2016, the opening day of the 2016–17 Premier League, Defoe scored in a 2–1 loss at Manchester City, meaning he has now scored in 16 Premier League seasons. On 5 November 2016, Defoe scored the winning goal from the penalty spot as 10-man Sunderland came from behind to win at Bournemouth, their first league win of the season. On 19 November 2016, Defoe scored his 150th Premier League goal in a 3–0 home win against Hull City, becoming the joint seventh highest goal scorer in Premier League history. On 2 January 2017, Defoe scored twice from the penalty spot as Sunderland came from behind to draw at home to Liverpool.

In January 2017, with Sunderland lying in the relegation zone, Defoe was linked with a return to former club West Ham United. However, Sunderland rejected a bid in the region of £6 million, with manager David Moyes describing Defoe as "priceless". On 4 February 2017, Defoe scored twice in first half stoppage time in a 4–0 away victory at Crystal Palace to move on to 14 league goals for the season.

=== AFC Bournemouth ===
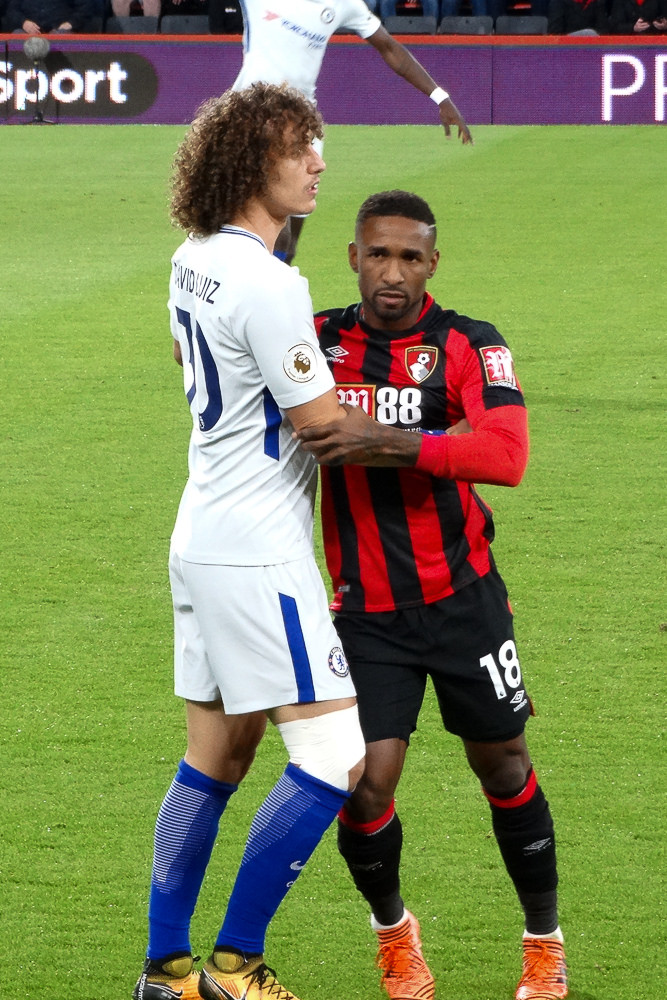
Defoe playing for AFC Bournemouth in 2017

In April 2017, Defoe hinted that he may leave Sunderland, if the club were to be relegated at the end of the 2016–17 Premier League. He was linked with a possible transfer to Newcastle United, and potential returns to former clubs Bournemouth and West Ham United. Sunderland's relegation was confirmed later that month. On 23 June, it was confirmed that Defoe had signed a contract with Bournemouth on a free transfer, leaving Sunderland on 1 July. He had previously played for the club in the 2000–01 season, on loan from West Ham United.

On 16 September 2017, Defoe scored the winning goal and his first goal since his return to Bournemouth in a 2–1 home win against Brighton, providing the team with its first victory in the 2017–18 Premier League season, meaning he had scored in 17 different Premier League seasons.

=== Rangers ===
After making only eight appearances for Bournemouth in the 2018–19 season, Defoe joined Scottish Premiership club Rangers on 6 January 2019 on an 18-month loan, with two recall clauses inserted into the deal, which could have been activated in July 2019 or January 2020. On 23 January 2019, he scored a debut goal for Rangers against Kilmarnock, which meant he had scored a debut goal for 5 of his last 7 clubs. After scoring in a game on 27 September 2019 he was involved in a car accident.

On 25 January 2020, it was announced that Defoe had signed a pre-contract agreement with Rangers, and would join the club permanently on a one-year deal, at the expiry of his Bournemouth contract in June 2020.

Defoe joined Rangers permanently in the summer transfer window of the 2020–21 season. He scored his 300th career club goal, against Livingston on 25 October 2020.

On 8 June 2021, Defoe signed a new one-year deal with Rangers to keep him at the club. As part of the contract, he also became a coach at the club. On 15 November 2021, following the departure of manager, Steven Gerrard from Rangers to Aston Villa, Defoe was named as part of a four-man caretaker team responsible for leading the club during the pursuit of a new permanent head coach. On 12 January 2022, Defoe departed Rangers.

=== Return to Sunderland ===
On 31 January 2022, Defoe re-signed for Sunderland on a short-term deal until the end of the 2021–22 season. Defoe made his 2nd debut for Sunderland in a 2-1 to loss to Doncaster Rovers at the Stadium of Light on 5 February.

On 24 March 2022 he announced his retirement from professional football.

== International career ==
=== Youth ===
Defoe was capped by England at two youth levels, earning eight caps for the under-16s and seven caps for the under-18s. Defoe's form for Bournemouth in the 2000–01 season saw him selected for the England under-21 team to play Mexico in May 2001, and he marked his debut with the second goal as England U21s won 3–0. He went on to gain 23 caps for England at under-21 level, scoring seven goals.

=== 2006 FIFA World Cup ===
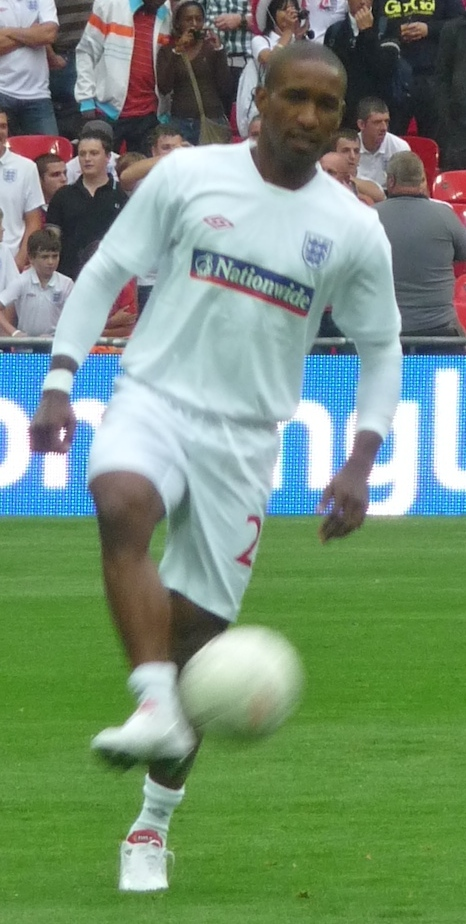
Defoe training with England in 2009

Defoe debuted for the senior England team in a 1–0 defeat to Sweden in March 2004, coming on as an early substitute for the injured Darius Vassell. England manager Sven-Göran Eriksson singled out Defoe's display for praise in an otherwise poor performance by England, saying, "Jermain Defoe did very well – I liked what I saw. He showed that he can do very well even in international football and that he is technically very good. Jermain is quick and he knows where the goal is." He was not however selected for the England squad to take part in UEFA Euro 2004.

He made his first start for England in a 2006 FIFA World Cup qualifying match against Poland in September 2004, scoring in a 2–1 win. Eriksson again paid tribute to Defoe, saying, "Jermain is a great talent. It couldn't have been much better for him. He did very well. He scored one goal and created other chances as well. He is a great player who will always score goals."

Despite appearing regularly for England in FIFA World Cup qualifying matches and friendly matches, Defoe was not named in the provisional England squad for the 2006 FIFA World Cup in Germany and named only on a five-man standby list. He joined the squad for training in Germany, but returned to England when Wayne Rooney was cleared to play after having suffered a foot injury in April. He confessed that he was baffled by his omission, saying, "I've been involved in every squad for the last two years and feel I've played a part in helping us to qualify. I have never felt fitter and sharper than I was in training and believe I could have scored goals in the tournament. It's a strange decision and everybody I speak to thinks so as well." Eriksson explained why Defoe was not selected for the England squad: "Jermain had a very bad season. I don't think he deserved to go to the World Cup."

=== 2010 FIFA World Cup ===
Steve McClaren, who took over as England manager after the FIFA World Cup, selected Defoe for England in his first match, a friendly against Greece in August 2006. Defoe continued to be selected and to appear for England in UEFA Euro 2008 qualifying matches and friendly matches.

Defoe was initially omitted from Fabio Capello's first squad with the new manager insisting he would only select players who were playing regular club football. One day after scoring on his Portsmouth debut, Defoe was recalled to the England squad to replace the injured Gabriel Agbonlahor. Defoe took his international goals tally up to five in the Caribbean on 1 June 2008 when he scored twice against Trinidad and Tobago and in the process staking a claim for a more regular place in the international team.

Defoe scored his first competitive international goal of 2008 with the final goal in England's 5–1 win over Kazakhstan on 11 October 2008 after coming on as a late substitute for Wayne Rooney. He also scored two goals in three minutes against Andorra in a 2010 FIFA World Cup qualifier.

His 2009–10 season got off to the perfect start as he came from the bench to score both goals in the 2–2 draw against the Netherlands at the Amsterdam Arena on 12 August 2009 and was announced as man of the match.

On 23 June 2010, he scored the only goal in England's third group stage match against Slovenia in the 2010 FIFA World Cup. This goal gave England the win they needed to progress into the Round of 16.

=== UEFA Euro 2012 and 2014 FIFA World Cup ===
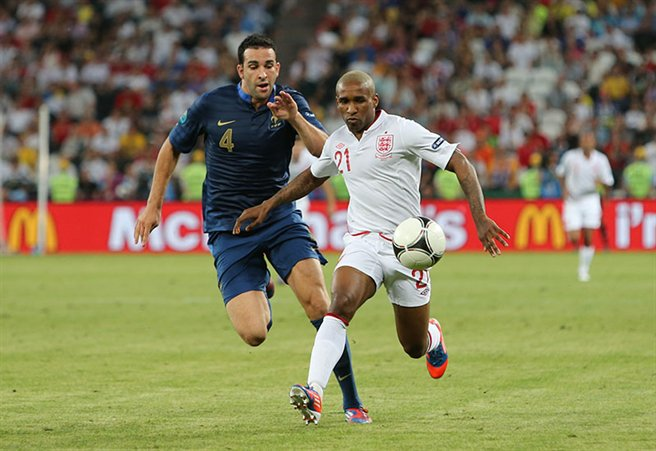
Defoe (right) playing for England at UEFA Euro 2012

Defoe opened up the scoring for England's UEFA Euro 2012 qualifying campaign against Bulgaria, volleying home from the six-yard box after a cross from Ashley Cole, whose initial effort was saved by the Bulgarian goalkeeper Nikolay Mihaylov. Defoe went on to score his first international hat-trick, which was the first ever at the new Wembley. Defoe was called up to the England squad to face Wales on 26 March 2011, though he served as an unused substitute. Defoe was named as a member of the England squad for UEFA Euro 2012.

Defoe did not play for the full 90 minutes in any of his England appearances until 11 September 2012 where he played the entire match against Ukraine.

Defoe started England's first 2014 FIFA World Cup qualifying match, a 5–0 away win against Moldova and scored his 17th goal for England, tying him with David Beckham.

Defoe was not included in the 23-man squad for the 2014 FIFA World Cup. Defoe believes that he "likely won't ever get over the decision", and stated, "I don't think I'll ever be at peace with it." However, he was named as one of seven players on "standby".

Defoe's form in the 2015–16 season, where he helped Sunderland avoid relegation with 15 goals, led to calls for him to be included in the England squad for UEFA Euro 2016. He was not, however, named in manager Roy Hodgson's 26-man preliminary squad, and expressed his disappointment at his omission.

=== 2017 ===
After over three years away from international football, Defoe was recalled to the England squad in March 2017 by manager Gareth Southgate for a friendly match against Germany and a 2018 FIFA World Cup qualifying match against Lithuania. On 26 March, Defoe returned to the first team, against Lithuania. Ahead of captain, Joe Hart, Defoe led the team onto the pitch with terminally ill child, Bradley Lowery, a Sunderland supporter who suffered from neuroblastoma. England won the match 2–0 with Defoe scoring the first goal.

== Influences and goal celebrations ==
In a 2018 interview with Sky Sports, Defoe spoke about the influence of former Arsenal striker Ian Wright on his career, which included being inspired by his goal celebrations. He explained that his own favourite celebration is outstretching both arms straight, before stating when scoring a goal "you just want to go mad".

== Coaching career ==
On 12 August 2022, Defoe returned to Tottenham Hotspur as club ambassador and an academy coach. Appointed as coach of the under-18's, Defoe said he aims to inspire more black coaches and managers. He left the role in July 2024 to concentrate on a managerial career.

On 29 March 2026, Defoe was appointed manager of National League club Woking. On 23 July 2026, just over two weeks before the start of the 2026–27 season, Woking announced the departure of Defoe. He left the club after just six league matches in charge, having recorded two wins.

== Personal life ==
Defoe is a practising Roman Catholic. He is a pescetarian and teetotal.

On 24 April 2009, his 26-year-old half-brother, Jade Defoe, died of head injuries following an assault in Leytonstone, London. On 7 June 2012, his father, Jimmy Defoe, died after a long battle with throat cancer. Defoe was with the England squad ahead of UEFA Euro 2012 at the time, and returned home from Poland upon receiving the news, but rejoined the squad on 9 June, two days before the opening match and played against France as a 77th-minute substitute.

Whilst playing for Sunderland, Defoe befriended Bradley Lowery, a terminally-ill six-year-old fan with neuroblastoma, describing their relationship as the "highlight of his season". Lowery was named 'Child of Courage' at the Pride of North East Awards in May 2017; Defoe attended the award ceremony, saying, "As a person he has changed me because of what he's going through at such a young age". Lowery died on 7 July 2017, at the age of 6.

Defoe was appointed an Officer of the Order of the British Empire (OBE) in the 2018 Birthday Honours for services to the Jermain Defoe Foundation, a charitable foundation he founded in 2013.

== Streetball career ==
He scored a hattrick in his debut game for 5iveguys fc and led them to a 10-7 victory over rivals MFC even though in a controvesial ruling a penalty goal he scored was disallowed. By scoring a hat trick he triggered a clause in his contract to receive unspecified goodies.

== Career statistics ==
=== Club ===
Appearances and goals by club, season and competition
Club	Season	League			National cup (Note: Includes FA Cup, Canadian Championship, Scottish FA Cup)		League cup (Note: Includes Football League Cup, Scottish League Cup)		Continental		Other		Total	
Club	Season	Division	Apps	Goals	Apps	Goals	Apps	Goals	Apps	Goals	Apps	Goals	Apps	Goals
West Ham United	1999–2000	Premier League	0	0	0	0	0	0	0	0	—		0	0
West Ham United	2000–01	Premier League	1	0	0	0	1	1	—		—		2	1
West Ham United	2001–02	Premier League	35	10	3	4	1	0	—		—		39	14
West Ham United	2002–03	Premier League	38	8	2	2	2	1	—		—		42	11
West Ham United	2003–04	First Division	19	11	0	0	3	4	—		—		22	15
West Ham United	Total		93	29	5	6	7	6	—		—		105	41
AFC Bournemouth (loan)	2000–01	Second Division	29	18	1	1	—		—		1 (Note: Appearance in Football League Trophy)	0	31	19
Tottenham Hotspur	2003–04	Premier League	15	7	0	0	—		—		—		15	7
Tottenham Hotspur	2004–05	Premier League	35	13	5	4	4	5	—		—		44	22
Tottenham Hotspur	2005–06	Premier League	36	9	1	0	1	0	—		—		38	9
Tottenham Hotspur	2006–07	Premier League	34	10	5	1	5	4	4 (Note: Appearances in UEFA Cup)	3	—		48	18
Tottenham Hotspur	2007–08	Premier League	19	4	2	0	5	1	5	3	—		31	8
Tottenham Hotspur	Total		139	43	13	5	15	10	9	6	—		176	64
Portsmouth	2007–08	Premier League	12	8	—		—		—		—		12	8
Portsmouth	2008–09	Premier League	19	7	0	0	0	0	4	2	1 (Note: Appearance in FA Community Shield)	0	24	9
Portsmouth	Total		31	15	0	0	0	0	4	2	1	0	36	17
Tottenham Hotspur	2008–09	Premier League	8	3	1	0	1	1	—		—		10	4
Tottenham Hotspur	2009–10	Premier League	34	18	7	5	2	1	—		—		43	24
Tottenham Hotspur	2010–11	Premier League	22	4	2	2	0	0	6 (Note: Appearances in UEFA Champions League)	3	—		30	9
Tottenham Hotspur	2011–12	Premier League	25	11	6	3	1	0	6 (Note: Appearances in UEFA Europa League)	3	—		38	17
Tottenham Hotspur	2012–13	Premier League	34	11	0	0	1	0	8	4	—		43	15
Tottenham Hotspur	2013–14	Premier League	14	1	0	0	3	2	5	7	—		22	10
Tottenham Hotspur	Total		137	48	16	10	8	4	25	17	—		186	79
Toronto FC	2014	Major League Soccer	19	11	2	1	—		—		—		21	12
Sunderland	2014–15	Premier League	17	4	2	0	—		—		—		19	4
Sunderland	2015–16	Premier League	33	15	0	0	1	3	—		—		34	18
Sunderland	2016–17	Premier League	37	15	2	0	1	0	—		—		40	15
Sunderland	Total		87	34	4	0	2	3	—		—		93	37
AFC Bournemouth	2017–18	Premier League	24	4	0	0	2	0	—		—		26	4
AFC Bournemouth	2018–19	Premier League	4	0	0	0	4	0	—		—		8	0
AFC Bournemouth	Total		28	4	0	0	6	0	—		—		34	4
Rangers (loan)	2018–19	Scottish Premiership	17	8	3	0	—		—		—		20	8
Rangers (loan)	2019–20	Scottish Premiership	20	13	2	1	3	1	7	2	—		32	17
Rangers	2020–21	Scottish Premiership	15	4	2	1	2	1	1	1	—		20	7
Rangers	2021–22	Scottish Premiership	2	0	0	0	0	0	0	0	—		2	0
Rangers	Total		54	25	7	2	5	2	8	3	—		74	32
Sunderland	2021–22	League One	7	0	—		—		—		—		7	0
Career total			624	227	48	25	43	25	46	28	2	0	763	305

=== International ===
Appearances and goals by national team and year
National team	Year	Apps	Goals
England	2004	8	1
England	2005	7	0
England	2006	6	2
England	2007	5	0
England	2008	6	3
England	2009	6	5
England	2010	7	4
England	2011	1	0
England	2012	6	2
England	2013	3	2
England	2014	0	0
England	2015	0	0
England	2016	0	0
England	2017	2	1
Total		57	20

Scores and results list England's goal tally first, score column indicates score after each Defoe goal.

List of international goals scored by Jermain Defoe
No.	Date	Venue	Cap	Opponent	Score	Result	Competition	Ref.
1	8 September 2004	Silesian Stadium, Chorzów, Poland	5	Poland	1–0	2–1	2006 FIFA World Cup qualification	
2	2 September 2006	Old Trafford, Manchester, England	18	Andorra	3–0	5–0	UEFA Euro 2008 qualification	
3	2 September 2006	Old Trafford, Manchester, England	18	Andorra	4–0	5–0	UEFA Euro 2008 qualification	
4	1 June 2008	Hasely Crawford Stadium, Port of Spain, Trinidad and Tobago	28	Trinidad and Tobago	2–0	3–0	Friendly	
5	1 June 2008	Hasely Crawford Stadium, Port of Spain, Trinidad and Tobago	28	Trinidad and Tobago	3–0	3–0	Friendly	
6	11 October 2008	Wembley Stadium, London, England	31	Kazakhstan	5–1	5–1	2010 FIFA World Cup qualification	
7	10 June 2009	Wembley Stadium, London, England	34	Andorra	4–0	6–0	2010 FIFA World Cup qualification	
8	10 June 2009	Wembley Stadium, London, England	34	Andorra	5–0	6–0	2010 FIFA World Cup qualification	
9	12 August 2009	Amsterdam Arena, Amsterdam, Netherlands	35	Netherlands	1–2	2–2	Friendly	
10	12 August 2009	Amsterdam Arena, Amsterdam, Netherlands	35	Netherlands	2–2	2–2	Friendly	
11	5 September 2009	Wembley Stadium, London, England	36	Slovenia	2–0	2–1	Friendly	
12	23 June 2010	Nelson Mandela Bay Stadium, Port Elizabeth, South Africa	42	Slovenia	1–0	1–0	2010 FIFA World Cup	
13	3 September 2010	Wembley Stadium, London, England	44	Bulgaria	1–0	4–0	UEFA Euro 2012 qualification	
14	3 September 2010	Wembley Stadium, London, England	44	Bulgaria	2–0	4–0	UEFA Euro 2012 qualification	
15	3 September 2010	Wembley Stadium, London, England	44	Bulgaria	4–0	4–0	UEFA Euro 2012 qualification	
16	15 August 2012	Stade de Suisse, Bern, Switzerland	49	Italy	2–1	2–1	Friendly	
17	7 September 2012	Zimbru Stadium, Chișinău, Moldova	50	Moldova	3–0	5–0	2014 FIFA World Cup qualification	
18	22 March 2013	San Marino Stadium, Serravalle, San Marino	53	San Marino	3–0	8–0	2014 FIFA World Cup qualification	
19	22 March 2013	San Marino Stadium, Serravalle, San Marino	53	San Marino	8–0	8–0	2014 FIFA World Cup qualification	
20	26 March 2017	Wembley Stadium, London, England	56	Lithuania	1–0	2–0	2018 FIFA World Cup qualification	

== Managerial statistics ==
As of match played 25 April 2026

Managerial record by team and tenure
Team	From	To	Record					Ref.
Team	From	To	P	W	D	L	Win %	Ref.
Woking	29 March 2026	23 July 2026	6	2	3	1	33.3	
Total			6	2	3	1	33.3	

== Honours ==
West Ham Academy Team

- Premier Academy League: 1999-00

Tottenham Hotspur

- Football League Cup: 2007–08

Rangers

- Scottish Premiership: 2020–21
- Scottish League Cup runner-up: 2019–20

Individual

- Tottenham Hotspur Player of the Year: 2004
- Football League Cup top scorer: 2004–05
- Premier League Player of the Month: August 2009
- Sunderland Supporters' Player of the Year: 2015–16
- Sunderland Player of the Year: 2015–16
- North-East FWA Player of the Year: 2016

Orders

- Officer of the Order of the British Empire: 2018

== See also ==
- List of footballers in England by number of league appearances (500+)
