= 2009–10 in French football =

Football in France
- Season: 2009–10

The 2009–10 season was the 77th season of competitive professional football in France.

The season began on 7 August 2009 for the Championnat National and Ligue 2 and on 8 August for Ligue 1 and the Championnat de France amateur. The season concluded on 14 May 2010 for Ligue 2, 15 May for Ligue 1, and 21 May for the Championnat National and the Championnat de France amateur.

== News ==
=== Supercup in Canada ===
On 12 May, it was announced that the 2009 Trophée des Champions will be played, for the first time, on international soil at Olympic Stadium in Montreal, Canada. The match will contest the winners of the 2008–09 Coupe de France, Guingamp, and the 2008–09 Ligue 1 champions, Bordeaux, with the objective being to promote French professional football abroad.

=== Match ball sponsorship ===
On 5 June, it was announced that German sportswear company Puma will become the official provider of match balls for the upcoming season after agreeing to a long term partnership with the Ligue de Football Professionnel (LFP).

=== Presidential departures ===
On 17 June, Marseille announced that they were parting ways with longtime chairman Pape Diouf. Diouf had been chairman of the club for five years and was the only black chairman ever to preside over a Ligue 1 club. Jean-Claude Dassier was announced as his replacement.

On 7 July, Auxerre announced that Alain Dujon will become the club's new president. He replaces Jean-Claude Hamel, who had presided over the club for over 46 years.

On 10 September, Paris Saint-Germain announced that president Sébastien Bazin would step down from his role in order to supervise the club's surveillance council. He was replaced by Robin Leproux.

=== Television deal ===
On 29 June, the LFP board of directors announced that France Télévisions will be the official provider of Coupe de la Ligue coverage for the next three seasons.

=== French football records ===
On 9 August 2009, Bordeaux established a record for most consecutive league wins with 12, surpassing Lille, who won 11 consecutive matches in 1949, winning their last four games of the 1948–49 season and their first seven in the 1949–50 season. Bordeaux's streak began during the 2008–09 Ligue 1 season on 14 March 2009 following a 2–1 victory over Nice. The club broke the record on the opening match day of this season defeating Lens 4–1. The record lasted for 14 matches before coming to an end on 30 August following the club's 0–0 draw with Marseille.

On 31 October 2009, Grenoble set a record for most consecutive losses in French football following the club's 11th-straight league defeat, an 0–2 loss to Lille. The previous record of ten-straight defeats, held by Sète, had been intact since 1947. The losing streak came to an end the following week, on 7 November, following the club's 0–0 draw with Monaco.

=== DNCG rulings ===
On 23 June, the Direction Nationale du Contrôle de Gestion (DNC) ruled that Arles-Avignon would not be allowed to play in Ligue 2 following their promotion from the Championnat National, due to irregularities in the club's management. On 3 July, following an appeal, the DNCG reversed its decision, reinstating Arles' Ligue 2 status.

Following the DNCG's annual report on clubs, on 25 June it was announced that six clubs had been relegated from the National to lower divisions: AS Beauvais, SO Cassis Carnoux, CS Louhans-Cuiseaux, and FC Libourne Saint-Seurin were relegated to the Championnat de France Amateurs. Meanwhile, Besançon RC, US Luzenac, and FC Rouen, who were all recently promoted, were relegated to Championnat de France Amateurs 2, while Sète and Calais RUFC were relegated to the Division d'Honneur. All clubs relegated were allowed to appeal the decision.

Following an appeal from the aforementioned clubs, Rouen, Beauvais and Luzenac had their appeals successfully overturned, meaning they will remain in the Championnat National. Some clubs were, however, unsuccessful. For example, Sète's appeal was upheld relegating them to the Division d'Honneur; Stade Plabennecois will replace them in the Championnat National. Libourne Saint-Seurin, Besançon and Calais' appeals were also rejected by the DNCG, though all three clubs have decided to take their case to the CNOSF, the National Sporting Committee of France which governs sport in France. Both Calais and Besançon's rulings were determined on 23 July. The CNOSF determined that Besançon should be relegated to the CFA and not CFA 2, while Calais should respect and oblige the DNCG's ruling relegated them to CFA 2.

Libourne's ruling was determined on 27 July, when the CNOSF informed the club that they should honor the DNCG's ruling and suffer relegation to the CFA. Libourne's chairman Bernard Layda responded by announcing the club will file for bankruptcy, restructure the club and oblige the ruling. Besançon and Libournce are slated to be replaced by ES Fréjus and AS Moulins.

Both Louhans-Cuiseaux and Cassis Carnoux had their appeals heard by the DNCG on 9 July. On 10 July, the DNGC ruled that both Louhans-Cuiseaux and Cassis-Carnoux rulings had been overturned, meaning they will play in the Championnat National this season.

On 6 August, just three days before the start of the season, the CNSOF ruled that CFA 2 club Olympique Saumur would be allowed promotion to the CFA on the assumption that the club was ranked second behind Les Herbiers VF in terms of the promotion chart following a current CFA club's relegation by means of a federation ruling. With Besançon's relegation to the CFA, it has been determined that two groups will have an allocation of 20 clubs, while one group will have an allocation of 19 clubs. Due to the sudden circumstances, on 7 August the France Football Federation (FFF) devised a brand new schedule for the CFA. The FFF also announced that they had rejected the CNOSF's proposal for integrating Saumur into the CFA. Saumur responding by announcing their intent to appeal the judgment in Administrative Court.

=== Turmoil at 2010 FIFA World Cup ===
On 19 June 2010, France international striker Nicolas Anelka was dismissed from the national team at the 2010 FIFA World Cup after reportedly having a dispute, in which obscenities were passed with team manager Raymond Domenech during the team's 2–0 loss against Mexico. The FFF condemned the actions and, following a meeting with Anelka, Domenech and team captain Patrice Evra, the FFF agreed to send the player home. The following day, Evra engaged in a heated confrontation with team trainer Robert Duverne, with Duverne having to be restrained by Domenech. The resulting confrontation led to the players returning to the team bus and canceling practice. The team's managing director, Jean-Louis Valentin, announced his resignation from his position and the FFF the same day, stating he was "sickened and disgusted" by the actions of the team. The team, through Domenech, later released a statement criticizing the FFF for sending Anelka home based on reports from the media. The FFF responded to the statement by declaring the player's boycott "unacceptable" and apologizing to the world for the conduct of the players. The FFF also announced that following the World Cup, the Federal Council would convene to discuss the current state of the team.

Five players were identified as having been key to the embarrassing events at the World Cup – Nicolas Anelka, Patrice Evra, Franck Ribéry, Jérémy Toulalan and Eric Abidal – and all were summoned to a hearing before the FFF disciplinary committee on 17 August 2010. After the expulsion of Anelka and ensuing training strike, Evra and Ribéry were summoned for failing in their duties as captain and vice-captain respectively; Toulalan was seen as the originator of the statement read out by coach Domenech to the media; while Abidal was accused of refusing to play in the final group match. After the hearing, Anelka was banned from playing for France for 18 games, Evra was banned for five, Ribéry for three and Toulalan for one, while Abidal was not punished. Anelka dismissed the sanction as irrelevant, considering himself already retired from international football.

== Promotion and relegation ==
Teams promoted to 2009–10 Ligue 1

- Champions: Lens
- Runners-up: Montpellier
- 3rd Place: Boulogne

Teams relegated from 2008–09 Ligue 1

- 18th Place: Caen
- 19th Place: Nantes
- 20th Place: Le Havre

Teams promoted to 2009–10 Ligue 2

- Champions: Istres
- Runners-up: Laval
- 3rd Place: Arles-Avignon

Teams relegated from 2008–09 Ligue 2

- 18th Place: Amiens
- 19th Place: Reims
- 20th Place: Troyes

Teams promoted to 2009–10 Championnat National

- Champions, Groupe A: Besançon
- Champions, Groupe B: Hyères
- Champions, Groupe C: Luzenac
- Champions, Groupe D: Rouen
- 2nd Place, Groupe D: Plabennec

Teams relegated from Championnat National 2008–09

- 17th Place: Niort
- 18th Place: Calais
- 19th Place: Cherbourg
- 20th Place: L'Entente

Teams promoted to 2009–10 Championnat de France Amateur

Promoted from CFA 2

- Champions, Groupe A: Marck
- Champions, Groupe B: Drancy
- Champions, Groupe C: Épinal
- Champions, Groupe D: Grenoble B
- 2nd Place, Groupe E: Le Pontet^{1}
- Champions, Groupe F: Toulouse Fontaines
- 2nd Place, Groupe G: Les Herbiers^{2}
- Champions, Groupe H: Carquefou
- 2nd Place, Groupe B : Ivry-sur-Seine
- 2nd Place, Groupe C : Amnéville
- 2nd Place, Groupe D : Bourg-Peronnas
- 2nd Place, Groupe H : Avranches

^{1}Saint-Raphael finished as Champions, but won't participate in next season's CFA because the club will fuse with ES Fréjus to form a new club. As such, Le Pontet was allowed to take their promotion spot.

^{2}Tours B finished as Champions, but won't participate in next season's CFA because the DNCG deemed the formation structure of the reserves inadequate. Les Herbiers were allowed to take their promotion spot.

Teams relegated from Championnat de France Amateurs 2008–09

- 16th Place, Groupe A: Vesoul
- 17th Place, Groupe A: Metz B
- 18th Place, Groupe A: Sainte-Geneviève
- 16th Place, Groupe B: Saint-Étienne B
- 17th Place, Groupe B: Saint-Priest
- 18th Place, Groupe B: AS Monaco B
- 16th Place, Groupe C: Châtellerault
- 17th Place, Groupe C: Bordelais
- 18th Place, Groupe C: Bergerac
- 16th Place, Groupe D: Red Star
- 17th Place, Groupe D: Guingamp B
- 18th Place, Groupe D: Vitré

== Managerial changes ==
=== Ligue 1 ===
Team	Outgoing	Manner	Date	Table	Incoming	Date	Table
Marseille	(Belgium) Eric Gerets	Resigned	12 May 2009	Off-season	(France) Didier Deschamps	1 July 2009	N/A
Paris Saint-Germain	(France) Paul Le Guen	Contract Expiration	30 June 2009	Off-season	(France) Antoine Kombouaré	1 July 2009	N/A
Nice	(France) Frédéric Antonetti	Contract Expiration	30 June 2009	Off-season	(France) Didier Ollé-Nicolle	1 July 2009	N/A
Monaco	(Brazil) Ricardo Gomes	Contract Expiration	30 June 2009	Off-season	(France) Guy Lacombe	1 July 2009	N/A
Valenciennes	(France) Antoine Kombouaré	Moved to Paris Saint-Germain	30 June 2009	Off-season	(France) Philippe Montanier	1 July 2009	N/A
Rennes	(France) Guy Lacombe	Move to Monaco	30 June 2009	Off-season	(France) Frédéric Antonetti	1 July 2009	N/A
Le Mans	(France) Arnaud Cormier	Mutual consent	30 June 2009	Off-season	(Portugal) Paulo Duarte	1 July 2009	N/A
Boulogne	(France) Philippe Montanier	Moved to Valenciennes	30 June 2009	Off-season	(France) Laurent Guyot	1 July 2009	N/A
Montpellier	(France) Rolland Courbis	Mutual consent	30 June 2009	Off-season	(France) René Girard	1 July 2009	N/A

==== In season ====
Team	Outgoing	Manner	Date	Table	Incoming	Date	Table
Le Mans	(Portugal) Paulo Duarte	Sacked	10 December 2009	19th	(France) Arnaud Cormier	10 December 2009	19th
Saint-Étienne	(France) Alain Perrin	Sacked	15 December 2009	18th	(France) Christophe Galtier	15 December 2009	18th
Nice	(France) Didier Ollé-Nicolle	Sacked	9 March 2010	17th	(France) Eric Roy	9 March 2010	17th

=== Ligue 2 ===
Team	Outgoing	Manner	Date	Table	Incoming	Date	Table
Bastia	(France) Bernard Casoni	Contract Expiration	30 June 2009	Off-season	(France) Philippe Anziani	1 July 2009	N/A
Clermont	(France) Didier Ollé-Nicole	Joined Nice	30 June 2009	Off-season	(Armenia) Michel Der Zakarian	1 July 2009	N/A
Le Havre	(France) Frédéric Hantz	Resigned	30 June 2009	Off-season	(France) Cédric Daury	1 July 2009	N/A
Nantes	(France) Elie Baup	Mutual consent	30 June 2009	Off-season	(Germany) Gernot Rohr	1 July 2009	N/A
Strasbourg	(France) Jean-Marc Furlan	Sacked	3 June 2009	Off-season	(France) Gilbert Gress	1 July 2009	N/A
Dijon	(Bosnia and Herzegovina) Faruk Hadžibegić	Sacked	20 June 2009	Off-season	(France) Patrice Carteron	1 July 2009	N/A

==== In season ====
Team	Outgoing	Manner	Date	Table	Incoming	Date	Table
Strasbourg	(France) Gilbert Gress	Sacked	24 August 2009	18th	(France) Pascal Janin	24 August 2009	18th
Bastia	(France) Philippe Anziani	Sacked	25 November 2009	20th	(Bosnia and Herzegovina) Faruk Hadžibegić	10 December 2009	20th
Nantes	(Germany) Gernot Rohr	Sacked	3 December 2009	7th	(France) Jean-Marc Furlan	3 December 2009	7th
Châteauroux	(France) Dominique Bijotat	Sacked	23 December 2009	16th	(France) Jean-Pierre Papin	29 December 2009	16th
Nantes	(France) Jean-Marc Furlan	Sacked	19 February 2010	14th	(France) Baptiste Gentilli	18 April 2010	14th
Metz	(France) Yvon Pouliquen	Sacked	17 April 2010	4th	(France) Joël Müller	18 April 2010	4th

=== Championnat National ===
Team	Outgoing	Manner	Date	Table	Incoming	Date	Table
Cannes	(France) Patrice Carteron	Sacked	29 June 2009	Off-season	(France) Albert Emon	1 July 2009	N/A
Reims	(France) Luis Fernandez	Sacked	12 June 2009	Off-season	(France) Marc Collat	1 July 2009	N/A
Troyes	(France) Claude Robin	Sacked	4 June 2009	Off-season	(France) Patrick Rémy	1 July 2009	N/A
Amiens	(France) Thierry Laurey	Sacked	10 June 2009	Off-season	(France) Serge Romano	1 July 2009	N/A

==== In season ====
Team	Outgoing	Manner	Date	Table	Incoming	Date	Table
Evian	(France) Stéphane Paille	Sacked	15 January 2010	1st	(France) Bernard Casoni	20 January 2010	1st

== Transfers ==
=== Notable transfers ===
Bordeaux completes the signing of midfielder Yoann Gourcuff after the player spent the entire 2008–09 season on loan from Italian club Milan. The transfer fee was priced at €15 million.

Defending Portuguese Liga champions Porto lose four players to three Ligue 1 title chasers, with Marseille signing midfielder Lucho González for €18 million, Lyon signing both striker Lisandro López for €24 million and defender Aly Cissokho for €15 million, and Toulouse signing Paulo Machado for a modest €3.5 million. Porto also lost veteran defender João Paulo to Le Mans for a fee of €1.5 million.

Guingamp striker Eduardo, who wrote his name into French football history by scoring both his team's goals in a 2–1 triumph in the Coupe de France final against Rennes, moves to recently promoted Lens for approximately €3 million.

Four France national team goalkeepers move clubs, with Cédric Carrasso joining Bordeaux for €8 million, Mickaël Landreau joining Lille from Paris Saint-Germain for €2 million, Yohann Pelé moving to Toulouse from Le Mans on a Bosman transfer, and Grégory Coupet makes his return Ligue 1 signing with PSG from La Liga side Atlético Madrid.

PSG sign two Ligue 1 stars for a total on €12 million, committing four years to both Turkish striker Mevlüt Erdinç and Lorient midfielder Christophe Jallet.

Nancy recruits three Bordeaux youngsters: Malian striker Cheick Diabaté, French defender Florian Marange and the Togolese midfielder Floyd Ayité. All join the club, with Diabaté and Ayité joining on loan for the entire season and Marange signing a one-year contract.

Saint-Étienne sign two Argentine internationals from the Primera División of Argentina. The first signing being striker Gonzalo Bergessio, formerly of San Lorenzo, for an undisclosed fee, and midfielder Augusto Fernández, who joins the club on loan for the entire season from River Plate.

== Honours ==
Competition	Winner	Details	Match Report
Ligue 1	Marseille	2009–10 Ligue 1	
Ligue 2	Caen	2009–10 Ligue 2	
Championnat National	Evian	2009–10 Championnat National	
Championnat de France amateur	Colmar	2009–10 Championnat de France Amateur	
Championnat de France amateur 2	Metz B	Championnat de France Amateurs 2 2009–10	
D1 Féminine	Lyon	D1 Féminine 2009–10	
Coupe de France	Paris Saint-Germain	2009–10 Coupe de France; Beat AS Monaco 1–0	Report
Coupe de la Ligue	Marseille	2009–10 Coupe de la Ligue; Beat Bordeaux 3–1	Report
Challenge de France	Paris Saint-Germain	2009–10 Challenge de France; Beat Montpellier 5–0	Report
Coupe Gambardella	Metz	2009–10 Coupe Gambardella; Beat Sochaux 4–3 on penalties	Report
Trophée des Champions	Bordeaux	2009 Trophée des Champions; Beat Guingamp 2–0	Report

== National teams ==
=== France ===
2010 FIFA World Cup qualification

First Round; 12 August 2009	Faroe Islands	0–1	France	Tórsvøllur, Tórshavn
17:00 CET		Report	Gignac 41'	Attendance: 2,974; Referee: Michael Koukoulakis (Greece)

First Round; 5 September 2009	France	1–1	Romania	Stade de France, Saint-Denis
21:00 CET	Henry 48'	Report	Escudé 55' (o.g.)	Attendance: 78,209; Referee: Ivan Bebek (Croatia)

First Round; 9 September 2009	Serbia	1–1	France	Stadion Crvena Zvezda, Belgrade
21:00 CET	Milijaš 12' (pen.)	Report	Henry 36'	Attendance: 49,456; Referee: Roberto Rosetti (Italy)

First Round; 10 October 2009	France	5–0	Faroe Islands	Stade du Roudourou, Guingamp
21:00 CET	Gignac 34', 38'; Gallas 52'; Anelka 86'; Benzema 88'	Report		Attendance: 16,755; Referee: Robert Małek (Poland)

First Round; 14 October 2009	France	3–1	Austria	Stade de France, Saint-Denis
21:00 CET	Benzema 18'; Henry 26' (pen.); Gignac 66'	Report	Janko 49'	Attendance: 78,099; Referee: Pedro Proença (Portugal)

Second Round; 14 November 2009	Republic of Ireland	0–1	France	Croke Park, Dublin
20:00 CET		Report	Anelka 72'	Attendance: 74,103; Referee: Felix Brych (Germany)

Second Round; 18 November 2009	France	1–1 (a.e.t)	Republic of Ireland	Stade de France, Saint-Denis
21:00 CET	Gallas 103'	Report	Keane 32'	Attendance: 79,145; Referee: Martin Hansson (Sweden)

Friendly

3 March 2010	France	0–2	Spain	Stade de France, Saint-Denis
21:00 CET		Report	Villa 21'; Ramos 49'	Attendance: 79,021; Referee: Craig Thomson (Scotland)

26 May 2010	France	2–1	Costa Rica	Stade Félix-Bollaert, Lens
21:00 CET	Sequeira 22' (o.g.); Valbuena 83'	Report	Hernández 12'	Attendance: 40,000; Referee: Vladislav Bezborodov (Russia)

30 May 2010	Tunisia	1–1	France	Stade 7 November, Radès
21:00 CET	Jemâa 5'	Report	Gallas 62'	Attendance: 50,000; Referee: Adel Rai (Libya)

4 June 2010	France	0–1	China	Stade Michel Volnay, Saint-Pierre, Réunion
18:00 CET		Report	Zhuoxiang 68'	Attendance: 8,000; Referee: Pedro Proença (Portugal)

2010 FIFA World Cup

Group Stage; 11 June 2010	Uruguay	0–0	France	Cape Town Stadium, Cape Town
20:30 CEST		Report		Attendance: 64,100; Referee: Yuichi Nishimura (Japan)

Group Stage; 17 June 2010	France	0–2	Mexico	Peter Mokaba Stadium, Polokwane
20:30 CEST		Report	Hernández 64'; Blanco 79' (pen.)	Attendance: 35,370; Referee: Khalil Al Ghamdi (Saudi Arabia)

Group Stage; 22 June 2010	France	1–2	South Africa	Free State Stadium, Bloemfontein
16:00 CEST	Malouda 70'	Report	Khumalo 20'; Mphela 37'	Attendance: 39,415; Referee: Óscar Ruiz (Colombia)

Last updated: 28 March 2010
Source: French Football Federation Les matches de l'équipe de France

=== France (women's) ===
2011 FIFA Women's World Cup qualification

Group Stage; 23 September 2009	Croatia	0–7	France	Stadion NK Inter Zaprešić, Zaprešić
16:00 CET		Report	Soubeyrand 25'; Franco 38', 55'; Delie 45'; Le Sommer 65'; Abily 78'; Thomis 90+3'	Attendance: 150; Referee: (Kazakhstan) Yuliliya Madvedeva

Group Stage; 24 October 2009	France	2–0	Iceland	Stade Gerland, Lyon
16:30 CET	Thiney 23'; Thomis 79'	Report		Attendance: 8,732; Referee: (Germany) Christine Beck

Group Stage; 28 October 2009	France	12–0	Estonia	Stade Jules Deschaseaux, Le Havre
18:00 CET	Herbert 27', 57'; Necib 31'; Abily 36'; Thiney 37', 41', 47'; Franco 40'; Thomis 79'; Delie 80', 90+1'; Prants 90+4' (o.g.)	Report		Attendance: 9,500; Referee: (Norway) Christina Pedersen

Group Stage; 21 November 2009	Serbia	0–2	France	Stadion FK Inđija, Inđija
13:00 CET		Report	Thiney 27'; Abily 45+3'	Attendance: 300; Referee: (Romania) Teodora Albon

Friendly

25 February 2010	Republic of Ireland	1–2	France	Richmond Park, Dublin
17:00 CET	Roche 78'	Report	Bompastor 52' (pen.); Delie 84'	Attendance: 700; Referee: (Republic of Ireland) Paul Tuite

2011 FIFA Women's World Cup qualification

Group Stage; 27 March 2010	France	6–0	Northern Ireland	Stade de la Libération, Boulogne-sur-Mer
16:30 CET	Franco 31'; Bompastor 34'; Le Sommer 47'; Delie 50'; Necib 54'; Hutton 71' (o.g.)	Report		Attendance: 6,691; Referee: (Italy) Silvia Tea Spinelli

Group Stage; 31 March 2010	Northern Ireland	0–4	France	Windsor Park, Belfast
19:45 CET		Report	Bompastor 17'; Abily 19'; Le Sommer 52'; Delie 90'	Referee: (Spain) Paloma Quintero Siles

Friendly

5 May 2010	Switzerland	0–2	France	Stadion Rankhof, Basel
18:30 CET		Report	Henry 29'; Soubeyrand 48' (pen.)	Attendance: 604; Referee: (Switzerland) Esther Staubli

2011 FIFA Women's World Cup qualification

Group Stage; 20 June 2010	France	3–0	Croatia	Stade Léo Lagrange, Besançon
	Thiney 22'; Le Sommer 57'; Delie 61'	Report		Attendance: 6,716; Referee: Cristina Dorcioman (Romania)

Group Stage; 23 June 2010	Estonia	0–6	France	Kadriorg Stadium, Tallinn
13:00 CET		Report	Thiney 21'; Thomis 53'; Bussaglia 54'; Le Sommer 60'; Delie 61', 90'	Referee: Sjoukje de Jong (Netherlands)

Last updated: 28 March 2010
Source: French Football Federation Women's Schedule

=== France U-21 ===
Friendly

12 August 2009	France	2–2	Poland	Parc des Sports Aguiléra, Biarritz
20:30 CET	Modeste 32'; Dervite 80'	Report	Małecki 65'; Korzym 90+1'	Attendance: 2,500; Referee: Carlos Clos Gómez (Spain)

2011 UEFA European Under-21 Football Championship qualification

First Round; 4 September 2009	Slovenia	1–3	France	Ob Jezeru, Velenje
15:00 CET	Mihelič 70'	Report	Modeste 18'; Bakar 43'; Škarabot 90+1' (o.g.)	Attendance: — Referee: Michael Lerjeus (Sweden)

First Round; 8 September 2009	France	2–2	Ukraine	Stade Jean Laville, Gueugnon
20:45 CET	Modeste 3'; Sakho 26'	Report	Chesnakov 45', 65'	Attendance: 7,600; Referee: Pavel Olsiak (Slovakia)

First Round; 9 October 2009	Malta	0–2	France	Ta' Qali National Stadium, Valletta
20:45 CET		Report	Modeste 54'; Aït-Fana 77'	Attendance: — Referee: Huw Jones (Wales)

13 October 2009	Belgium	0–0	France	Stade Le Canonnier, Mouscron
20:45 CET		Report		Attendance: 4,200; Referee: Thorsten Kinhöfer (German)

Friendly

13 November 2009	France	1–1	Tunisia	Stade de la Vallée du Cher, Tours
20:45 CET	Sako 2'	Report	Ayari 52'	Attendance: 4,832; Referee: Christof Virant (Belgium)

2011 UEFA European Under-21 Football Championship qualification

First Round; 17 November 2009	France	1–0	Slovenia	Stade Auguste-Delaune II, Reims
19:50 CET	Sankharé 90+2'	Report		Attendance: 11,394; Referee: Meir Levi (Israel)

Friendly

2 March 2010	France	3–1	Croatia	Stade Auguste-Delaune II, Reims
20:50 CET	Roux 20', 50'; Modeste 89'	Report	Perišić 24'	Attendance: 10,502; Referee: Michael Weiner (Germany)

20 May 2010	Argentina	3–3	France	Complexe Sportif d'Ezeiza, Buenos Aires
20:30 CET	Ro. Funes Mori 19', 30', 89'	Report	Biabiany 44'; Martin 63'; Rivière 70'	Referee: Sebastián Bresba (Argentina)

24 May 2010	Argentina	2–2	France	Complexe Sportif d'Ezeiza, Buenos Aires
20:30 CET	Ferreyra 76'; Mosca 90+2'	Report	Modeste 43'; Biabiany 74'	Referee: TBD

=== France U-20 ===
- The France under-20 team competed in the quad-annual Mediterranean Games football tournament that was contested from 25 June to 5 July in Pescara, Italy. France finished in a respectable 4th place losing to Libya on penalties in the third place match. The U-20 team will also compete in the 2009 edition of the Francophone Games that will be held in Beirut, Lebanon to begin on 26 September.
25 June 2009
17:00 CET

France	2–0	Turkey
Malonga 20'; Joseph-Monrose 76'	Report

Stadio Comunale, Teramo, Italy
Referee: (Libya) Gamail Embaia

29 June 2009
17:00 CET

France	1–0	Malta
Lasimant 7'	Report

Stadio Comunale, Teramo, Italy
Referee: Fernando Teixeira Vitienes (Spain)

1 July 2009
21:00 CET

France	1–2	Spain
Tabanou 87'	Report	Nsue 42'; Víctor 51'

Stadio Comunale, Teramo, Italy
Referee: (Montenegro) Nikola Dabanović

4 July 2009
19:00 CET

Libya	0 – 0 8 – 7 pen.	France
	Report

Stadio Guido Angelini, Chieti, Italy
Referee: Mauro Bergonzi (Italy)

28 September 2009
21:00 CET

France	1–1	Senegal
Cissé 34'	Report	Wade 27'

Rafic El-Hariri Stadium, Beirut, Lebanon
Attendance: (Ivory Coast) M. Kouame N'Dri

26 September 2009
21:00 CET

France	0–1	Morocco
	Report	Kachani 1'

Beirut Municipal Stadium, Beirut, Lebanon

Last updated: 30 March 2010
Source: French Football Federation U-21 Schedule

=== France U-19 ===
2009 Sendaï Cup

Group Stage; 9 September 2009	Japan	3–3	France	Sendai Stadium, Sendai
16:00 CET	Kiyotake 39', 79'; Barada 55'	Report	Kakuta 7', 60'; Bakambu 44'	Attendance: — Referee: (Japan) Imehuro Inoue

Group Stage; 12 September 2009	France	1–0	South Korea	Sendai Stadium, Sendai
14:00 CET	Bahamboula 31'	Report		Attendance: — Referee: (Japan) Yuki Noda

Group Stage; 13 September 2009	Brazil	1–0	France	Sendai Stadium, Sendai
14:00 CET	Gerson 35'	Report		Attendance: — Referee: (Japan) Iomohuro Inoue

Friendly

9 October 2009	Netherlands	4–2	France	Werkendam Stadium, Werkendam
18:00 CET	Bonevacia 22'; Cabral 24'; Burnet 35'; Berghuis 56'	Report	Tafer 36'; Fofana 89'	Attendance: — Referee: (Netherlands) Maarten Ketting

12 October 2009	Belgium	1–0	France	Stade Freethiel, Beveren
18:00 CET	Kabasele 4'	Report		Attendance: — Referee: (Belgium) Sam Loeman

14 October 2009	Belgium	1–2	France	Wassland Stadium, Wassland
18:00 CET	Kabasele 59'	Report	Tafer 4'; Salibur 89'	Attendance: — Referee: (Belgium) Christophe Dierck

Tournio de Limoges

Group Stage; 11 November 2009	France	1–0	Poland	Stade de Beaublanc, Limoges
17:00 CET	Tafer 73'	Report		Attendance: — Referee: (France) Silas Billong

Group Stage; 13 November 2010	France	3–3	Greece	Stade de Beaublanc, Limoges
17:00 CET	Grenier 46'; Bourgeois 59'; Tafer 90+2'	Report	Koutroubis 68', 90+4'; Tsitas 70'	Attendance: — Referee: (France) Mme Sabine Bonnin

Group Stage; 15 November 2010	France	2–2	Switzerland	Stade de Beaublanc, Limoges
17:00 CET	Sunu 64'; Tafer 90'	Report	Gadient 8'; Aratore 90+2'	Attendance: — Referee: (France) Silhas Billong

Friendly

2 March 2010	France	0–0	Ukraine	Complexe du Petit-Bois, Saint-Jean-de-Braye
17:00 CET		Report		Attendance: — Referee: (France) Benoît Millot

4 March 2010	France	2–1	Ukraine	Complexe Sportif des Crébezeaux, Saint-Denis
17:00 CET	Lacazette 63'; Griezmann 88'	Report	Koval 53'	Attendance: — Referee: (France) Benoît Bastien

31 March 2010	France	2–0	Denmark	Stade Camille Tisserand, Nœux-les-Mines
15:00 CET	Damour 35'; Roux 62'	Report		Referee: (France) Ludovic Rémy

Unofficial Friendly

20 April 2010	France	1–1	(Île-de-France) Paris FC	Clairefontaine, Clairefontaine-en-Yvelines
18:00 CET	Reale 88'	Report	Roye 24'	Referee: TBD

2010 UEFA European Under-19 Football Championship

Group stage 18 July 2010	France	4–1	Netherlands	Stade Michel d'Ornano, Caen
20:00 CEST	Kakuta 20'; Bakambu 44', 90'; Martins Indi 84' (o.g.)	Report	Cabral 55'	Referee: Vladislav Bezborodov (Russia)

Group stage 21 July 2010	France	5–0	Austria	Stade du Hazé, Flers
16:00 CEST	Griezmann 19', 73'; Lacazette 66', 83'; Reale 80'	Report		Referee: Alan Black (Northern Ireland)

Group stage 24 July 2010	England	1–1	France	Stade Louis Villemer, Saint-Lô
18:00 CEST	Phillips 90'	Report	Tafer 56'	Referee: Stephan Studer (Switzerland)

Semi-finals; 27 July 2010	France	2–1	Croatia	Stade Michel d'Ornano, Caen
	Kakuta 37'; Bakambu 83'	Report	Ademi 4'	Referee: Vladislav Bezborodov (Russia)

Final; 30 July 2010	Spain	1–2	France	Stade Michel d'Ornano, Caen
19:00 CEST	Rodrigo 18'	Report	Sunu 49'; Lacazette 82'	Referee: Stephan Studer (Switzerland)

Last updated: 28 March 2010
Source: French Football Federation U-19 Schedule

=== France U-17 ===
2010 UEFA European Under-17 Football Championship First Round qualification

First Round; 17 October 2009	France	3–1	Slovenia	Linnastaadion, Rakvere
14:00 CET	Deligny 20'; A. Doucouré 41'; Sanogo 61'	Report	Palčič 62'	Attendance: — Referee: Tsvetan Georgiev (Bulgaria)

First Round; 19 October 2009	Estonia	1–3	France	Kadrioru Stadium, Tallinn
14:00 CET	Leht 20'	Report	Sanogo 7', 70'; Omrani 78'	Attendance: — Referee: Jovan Kaludjerovic (Montenegro)

First Round; 22 October 2009	Ukraine	1–1	France	Linnastaadion, Rakvere
14:00 CET	Lukanyuk 21'	Report	Tandia 78'	Attendance: — Referee: (Turkey) Halis Özkahya

2010 UEFA European Under-17 Football Championship Elite Round qualification

Elite Round; 26 March 2010	France	0–1	Turkey	Complexe Sportif de Périgny, Périgny
20:00 CET		Report	Derici 34'	Attendance: — Referee: Steven McLean (Scotland)

Elite Round; 28 March 2010	France	1–0	Norway	Complexe Sportif de Périgny, Périgny
19:00 CET	Deligny 76'	Report		Attendance: — Referee: Steven McLean (Scotland)

Elite Round; 31 March 2010	Wales	0–4	France	Stade François Le Parco, La Rochelle
18:00 CET		Report	Koura 35'; Omrani 52', 71', 72'	Referee: Artyom Kuchin (Kazakhstan)

2010 UEFA European Under-17 Football Championship

Group Stage; 18 May 2010	France	1–2	Spain	Rheinpark Stadion, Vaduz
17:30 CET	Koura 65'	Report	Bernat 24'; Alcácer 74'	Referee: Euan Norris (Scotland)

Group Stage; 21 May 2010	France	1–0	Portugal	Sportpark Eschen-Mauren, Eschen
20:00 CET	Pogba 29'	Report		Referee: Christof Virant (Belgium)

Group Stage; 24 May 2010	Switzerland	1–3	France	Sportpark Eschen-Mauren, Eschen
17:00 CET	Žarković 29'		Sanogo 43', 47'; Koura 64'	Referee: Vadims Direktorenko (Latvia)

Semi-finals; 27 May 2010	England	2–1	France	Rheinpark Stadion, Vaduz
20:00 CET	Wickham 23', 40'	Report	Pogba 56'	Referee: Stanislav Todorov (Bulgaria)

Last updated: 27 March 2010
Source: French Football Federation U-17 Schedule

== See also ==
2009–10 season

- Olympique Lyonnais Ligue 1
- Paris Saint-Germain Ligue 1
- Olympique Marseille Ligue 1
- Rennes Ligue 1
- Chamois Niortais CFA
