= 2009 Trophée des Champions =

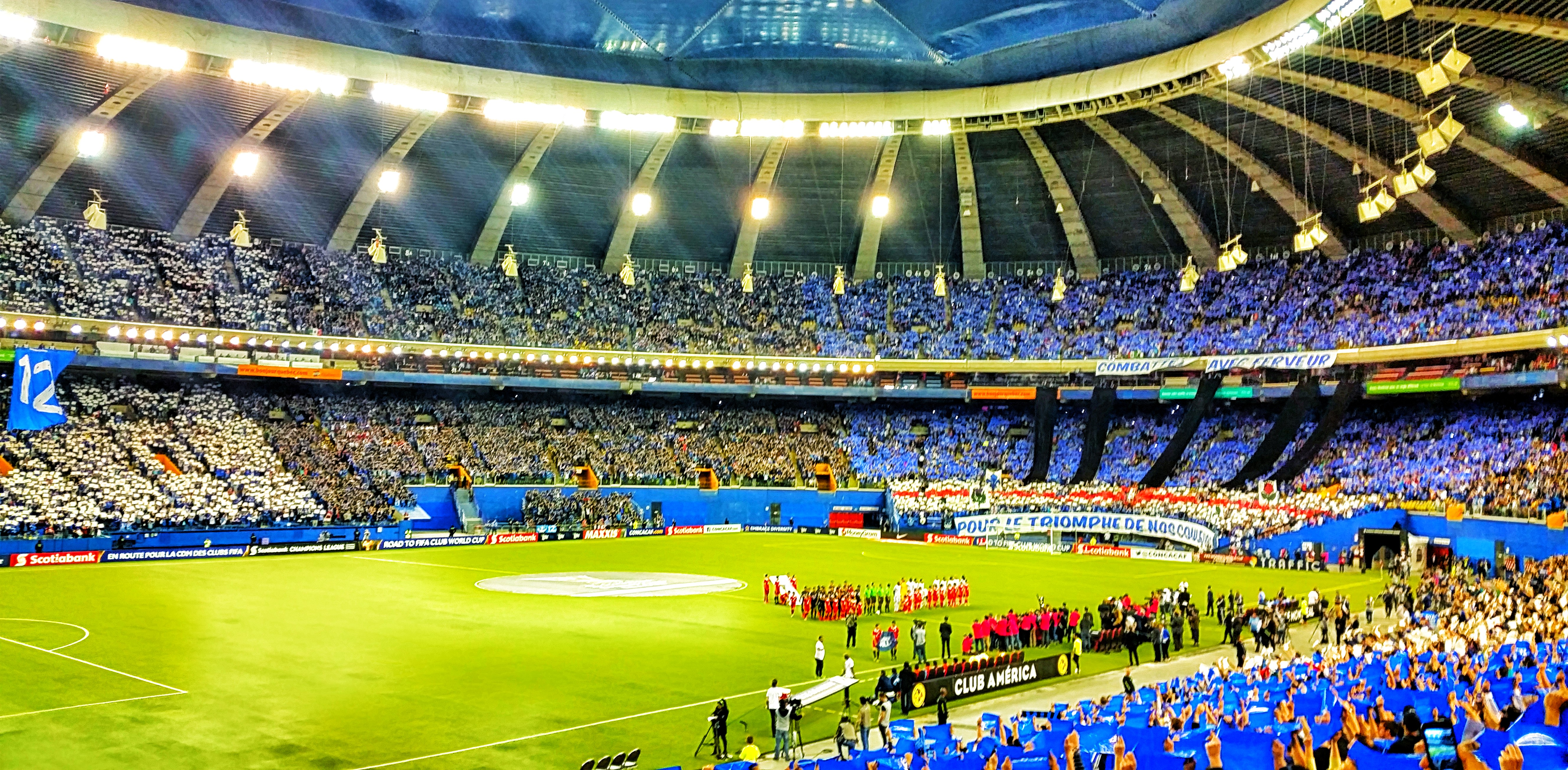
- The Olympic Stadium in Montreal
- Event: Trophée des Champions
Bordeaux	Guingamp
Ligue 1	Ligue 2
2	0
- Date: 25 July 2009
- Venue: Olympic Stadium, Montreal, Canada
- Man of the Match: (France) Yoann Gourcuff
- Referee: (Canada) Steve DePiero
- Attendance: 34,068
- Weather: 23 °C (73 °F), Cloudy (Domed structure)

The 2009 Trophée des Champions Final was a football match that was played on 25 July 2009. The match was contested between the winners of 2008–09 Coupe de France, En Avant Guingamp, and the 2008–09 Ligue 1 champions, FC Girondins de Bordeaux. The match was played, for the first time, on international soil at the Olympic Stadium in Montreal, Canada with the objective being to promote French professional football abroad.

Bordeaux captured their 3rd Trophée des Champions overall and their second straight after defeating Guingamp 2–0 with goals from the Argentine Fernando Cavenaghi in the 39th minute and the Brazilian Fernando Menegazzo in the 90th minute.

== Match details ==
25 July 2009
21:00 CEST/15:00 EDT

Bordeaux	2–0	Guingamp
Cavenaghi 39'; Fernando 90'	Report

Olympic Stadium, Montreal
Attendance: 34,068
Referee: (Canada) Steve DePiero

Bordeaux	Guingamp

BORDEAUX:
GK	1	(France) Cédric Carrasso
RB	3	(Brazil) Henrique
CB	21	(France) Mathieu Chalmé	(yellow card) 74'
CB	27	(France) Marc Planus
LB	28	(France) Benoît Trémoulinas
DM	4	(France) Alou Diarra (c)
RM	17	(Brazil) Wendel		(substituted off) 78'
LM	18	(Czech Republic) Jaroslav Plašil		(substituted off) 65'
AM	8	(France) Yoann Gourcuff
FW	29	(Morocco) Marouane Chamakh
FW	9	(Argentina) Fernando Cavenaghi		(substituted off) 65'
Substitutes:
GK	16	(France) Ulrich Ramé
DF	6	(France) Franck Jurietti
MF	5	(Brazil) Fernando Menegazzo		(substituted on) 65'
MF	10	(Brazil) Jussiê		(substituted on) 78'
MF	22	(France) Grégory Sertic
FW	7	(France) Yoan Gouffran		(substituted on) 65'
FW	11	(France) David Bellion
Manager:
(France) Laurent Blanc

GUINGAMP:
GK	1	(France) Stéphane Trévisan
RB	2	(France) Yves Deroff		(substituted off) 65'
CB	6	(Burkina Faso) Bakary Koné
CB	29	(Angola) Luís Delgado
LB	5	(Senegal) Mustapha Diallo	(yellow card) 60'
DM	18	(France) Fabrice Colleau (c)
RM	20	(France) Richard Soumah		(substituted off) 68'
CM	23	(France) Igor Djoman	(yellow card) 16'
CM	25	(Benin) Mouritala Ogunbiyi
LM	26	(France) Thibault Giresse		(substituted off) 54'
FW	7	(France) Sébastien Grax
Substitutes:
GK	16	(France) Guillaume Gauclin
DF	21	(France) Thierry Argelier		(substituted on) 65'
MF	10	(Morocco) Alharbi El-Jadeyaoui		(substituted on) 54'
MF	17	(Algeria) Jugurtha Hamroun
MF	33	(France) Mael Illien
FW	11	(France) Hervé Bazile		(substituted on) 68'
FW	14	(Senegal) Mohamed Soly
Manager:
(France) Victor Zvunka

MATCH OFFICIALS

- Referee: (Canada) Steve DePiero
- Assistant referees:
  - (Canada) Daniel Belleau
  - (Canada) Nicolas Dubuc
- Fourth official: (Canada) Mathieu Bourdeau

MAN OF THE MATCH

- (France) Yoann Gourcuff

MATCH RULES

- 90 minutes.
- Penalty shoot-out if scores level after 90 minutes.
- Seven named substitutes
- Maximum of 3 substitutions.

== See also ==
- 2009–10 Ligue 1
- 2009–10 Coupe de France
- 2009–10 FC Girondins de Bordeaux season
- 2015 Trophée des Champions
