= Felipe Saad =

Brazilian footballer (born 1983)

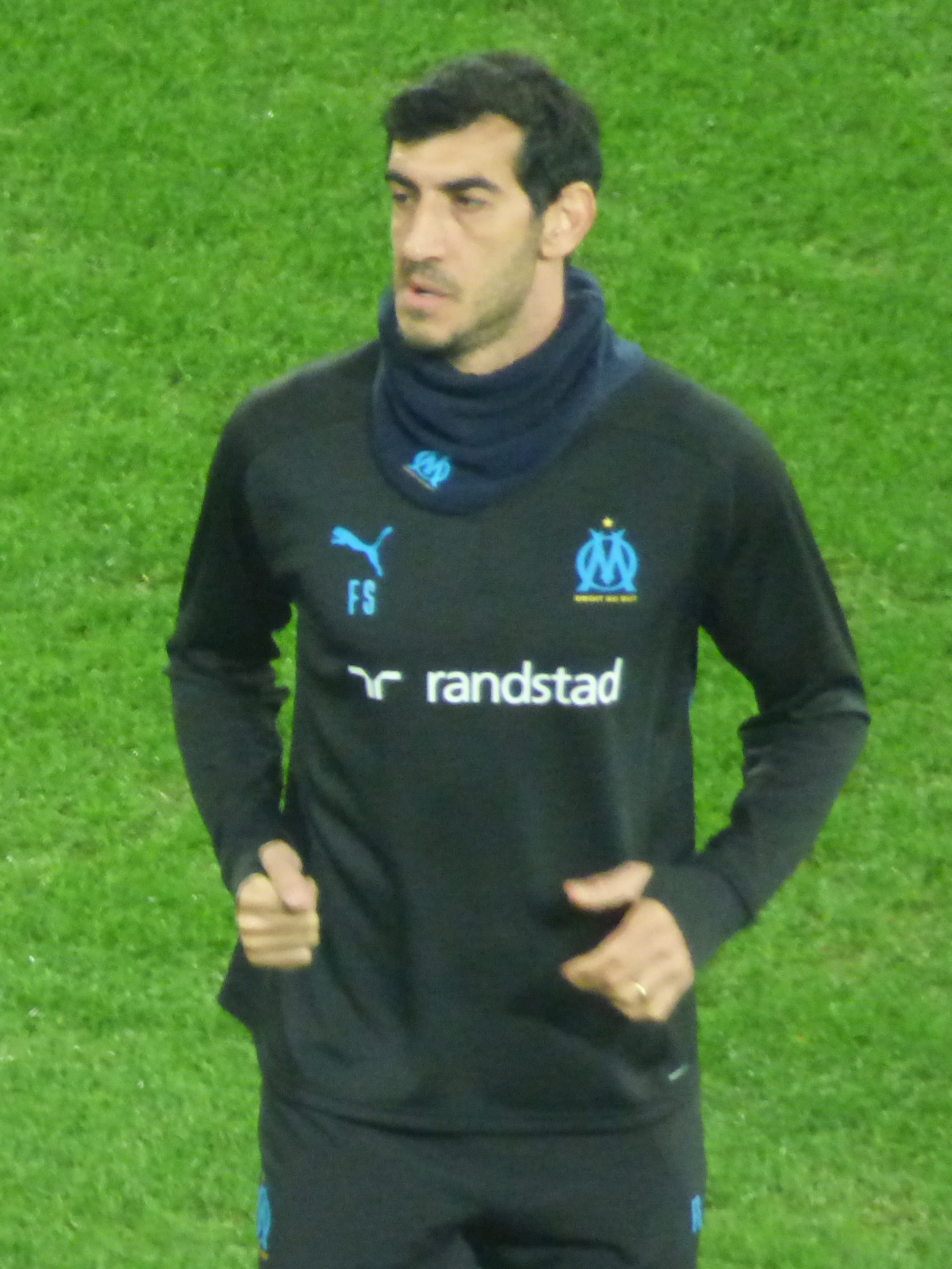
- Felipe Saad in 2022

Personal information
- Full name: Felipe Patavino Saad
- Date of birth: 11 September 1983 (age 43)
- Place of birth: Santos, Brazil
- Height: 1.87 m (6 ft 2 in)
- Position: Defender

Team information
- Current team: Marseille (loan player manager)

Youth career
- 1998–2003: Vitória

Senior career*
Years	Team	Apps	(Gls)
2003–2007	Vitória	22	(0)
2005	→ Paysandu (loan)	13	(0)
2006	→ Botafogo (loan)	9	(0)
2007–2010	Guingamp	76	(0)
2010–2012	Evian	20	(1)
2012–2013	Ajaccio	14	(0)
2013–2015	Caen	25	(0)
2015–2017	Strasbourg	46	(3)
2017–2019	Lorient	49	(0)
2019–2020	Paris FC	10	(0)
Total		284	(4)

Managerial career
- 2020–2021: Caen (scout)
- 2021–2022: Marseille (technical coordinator)
- 2023–: Marseille (loan player manager)
- * Club domestic league appearances and goals

Felipe Patavino Saad (born 11 September 1983) is a Brazilian former professional footballer who played as a defender.

Whilst at Guingamp, then in Ligue 2, Saad played in the 2009 Coupe de France final in which they beat Rennes.

== Playing career ==
In July 2015, Saad joined Strasbourg from Caen, signing a two-year contract.

In July 2019, Saad joined Ligue 2 side Paris FC from league rivals Lorient. He had been facing new competition at Lorient with the arrivals of defenders Julien Laporte and Thomas Fontaine for the 2019–20 season.

== Managerial career ==
In summer 2020, after being released by Paris FC, Saad retired from playing and took up a position at former club Caen as "recruiter" while also working as a consultant for RMC. Beside that, he was also hired as a scout for his former club, Caen. A year later, he was hired by as a translator. In March 2022, he got a new role at Marseille, as technical coordinator.

== Personal life ==
Saad is of Lebanese descent through his paternal great-grandfather, and of Italian descent on his mother's side. His mother was born in Colletorto, Molise, and moved to Brazil aged three with her parents.

He is a dual citizen of Brazil and Italy, having obtained Italian citizenship aged 14.

== Honours ==
Vitória

- Campeonato Baiano: 2003, 2004
- Copa do Nordeste: 2003
- Taça Estado da Bahia: 2004

Paysandu

- Campeonato Paraense: 2005

Botafogo

- Campeonato Carioca: 2006
- Taça Guanabara: 2006
- Taça Rio: 2007

Guingamp

- Coupe de France: 2008–09
- Trophée des Champions runner-up: 2009

Evian

- Ligue 2: 2010–11

Strasbourg

- Ligue 2: 2016–17
- Championnat National: 2015–16
