= 2009 Coupe de France final =

Final of the 2008–09 edition of the Coupe de France

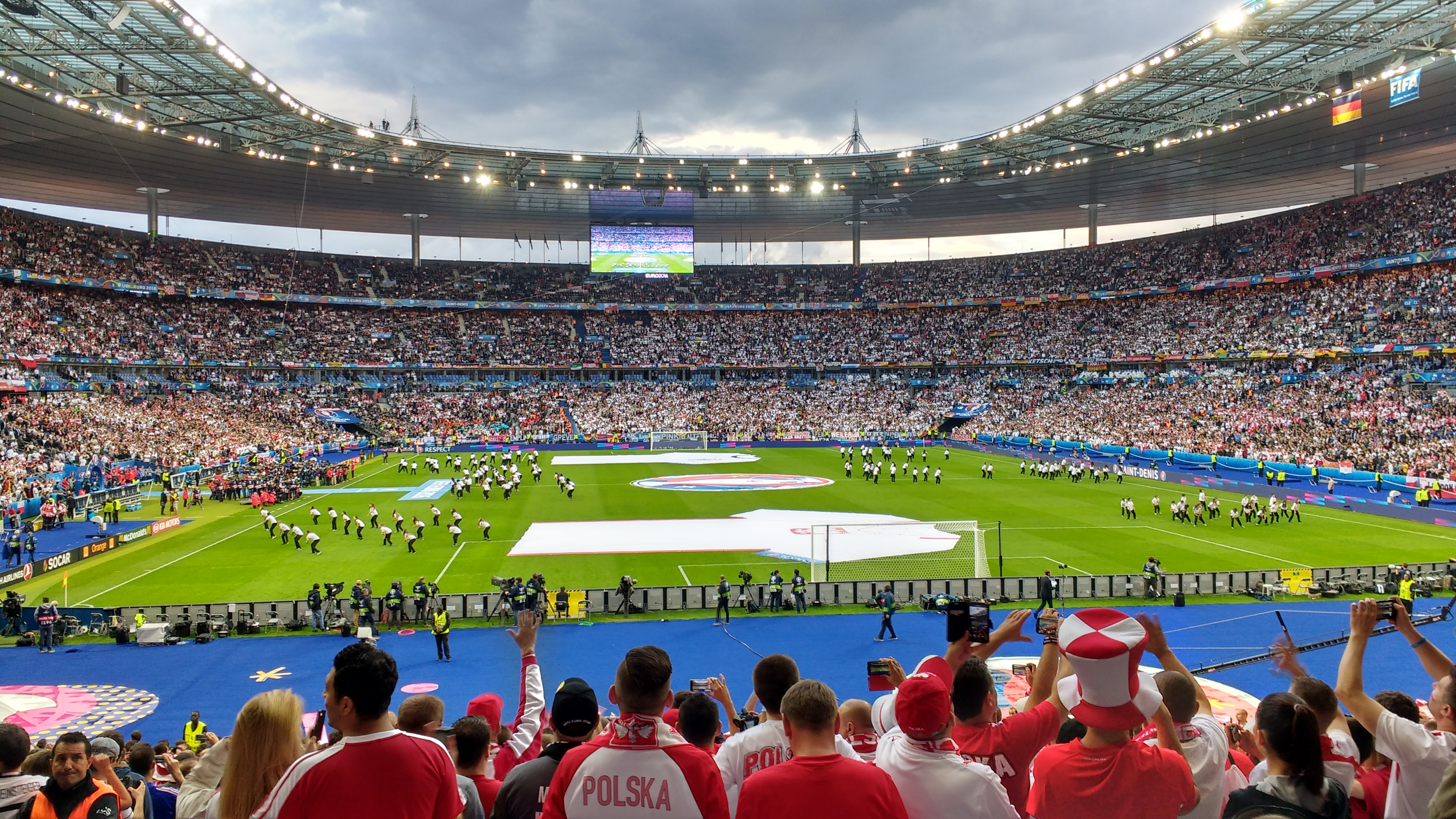
- Event: 2008–09 Coupe de France
Rennes	Guingamp
Ligue 1	Ligue 2
1	2
- Date: 9 May 2009
- Venue: Stade de France, Saint-Denis
- Man of the Match: (Brazil) Eduardo
- Referee: (France) Thierry Auriac
- Attendance: 80,056
- Weather: 15 °C (59 °F), Mostly Cloudy

The 2009 Coupe de France final was the 91st final of France's most prestigious cup competition, the Coupe de France. The final was played at the Stade de France in the Paris suburb of Saint-Denis on 9 May 2009 and was contested between Rennes of Ligue 1 and Guingamp of Ligue 2. Guingamp earned its first Coupe de France trophy after defeating Rennes 2–1 through two second-half goals from Eduardo.

== Background ==
This was Rennes' fifth appearance in the final, having won the cup in 1965 and 1971, and finishing as runners-up in 1922 and 1935. It was Rennes' first final playing under its new emblem and name having achieved the previous honours under the Université Club emblem. This was Guingamp's second appearance in the final, having previously appeared in the 1997 final, losing to Nice on penalties.

This was the first final since 1956 in which both finalists, from Brittany, were based in the same region of France (disregarding two finals between Olympique Marseille and AS Monaco FC – the tiny independent Principality of Monaco is surrounded by the Provence-Alpes-Côte d'Azur region).

Rennes was designated as the home team and wore their original red and black kit. Due to Guingamp having similar colours, both for home and away, they turned out in an all-white kit for the final.

== Route to the final ==
Rennes			Round	Guingamp
Opponent	H/A	Result	2008–09 Coupe de France	Opponent	H/A	Result
Bye	—	—	Seventh Round	Dinard	A	5–0
Bye	—	—	Eighth Round	La Vitréenne	H	1–1 (a.e.t.); 4−1 pen.
Sochaux	A	1–0	Round of 64	Tour d'Auvergne Rennes	A	0–0 (a.e.t.); 5−4 pen.
Saint-Étienne	H	2–0	Round of 32	Brest	H	2–0 (a.e.t.)
Lorient	H	3–0 (a.e.t.)	Round of 16	Le Mans	H	1–0
Rodez	H	2–0	Quarter-finals	Sedan	A	3–1
Grenoble	A	1–0	Semi-finals	Toulouse	A	2–1

== Match report ==
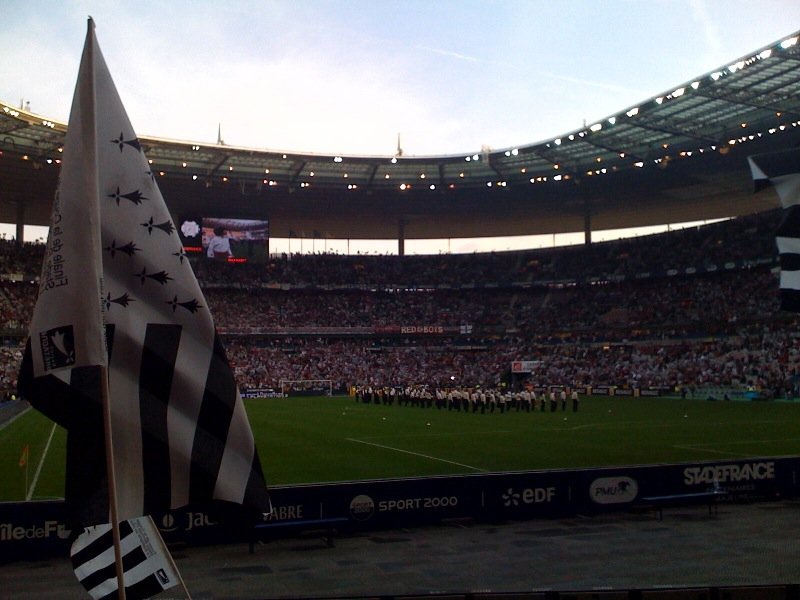
The opening of the 2009 final of Coupe de France at Stade de France, seeing La Garde Républicaine performing Tri Martolod and Bro Gozh ma Zadoù, the former being made famous by Breton musician Alan Stivell and the latter being the hymn of Brittany.

The first half of the 91st final of the Coupe de France was relatively equal early on, but it was Guingamp who attacked early on, with striker Eduardo forcing a fingertip save from Nicolas Douchez after he dislodged defender Rod Fanni in the 12th minute. This was followed up by a long-range chance from midfielder Lionel Mathis, which sailed wide left. Rennes was primarily held to taking long-range shots, however Moussa Sow tested Guillaume Gauclin in the 23rd minute, producing a shot which went just wide. The best chance of the first half would come for Guingamp in the 31st minute when Wilson Oruma' cross into the box found an un-marked Richard Soumah, who forced a tremendous save from Douchez. Rennes responded in the 40th minute with Jérôme Leroy taking an unexpected shot from nearly 30 metres from goal; the shot went past goalkeeper Gauclin, but struck the post going out of play.

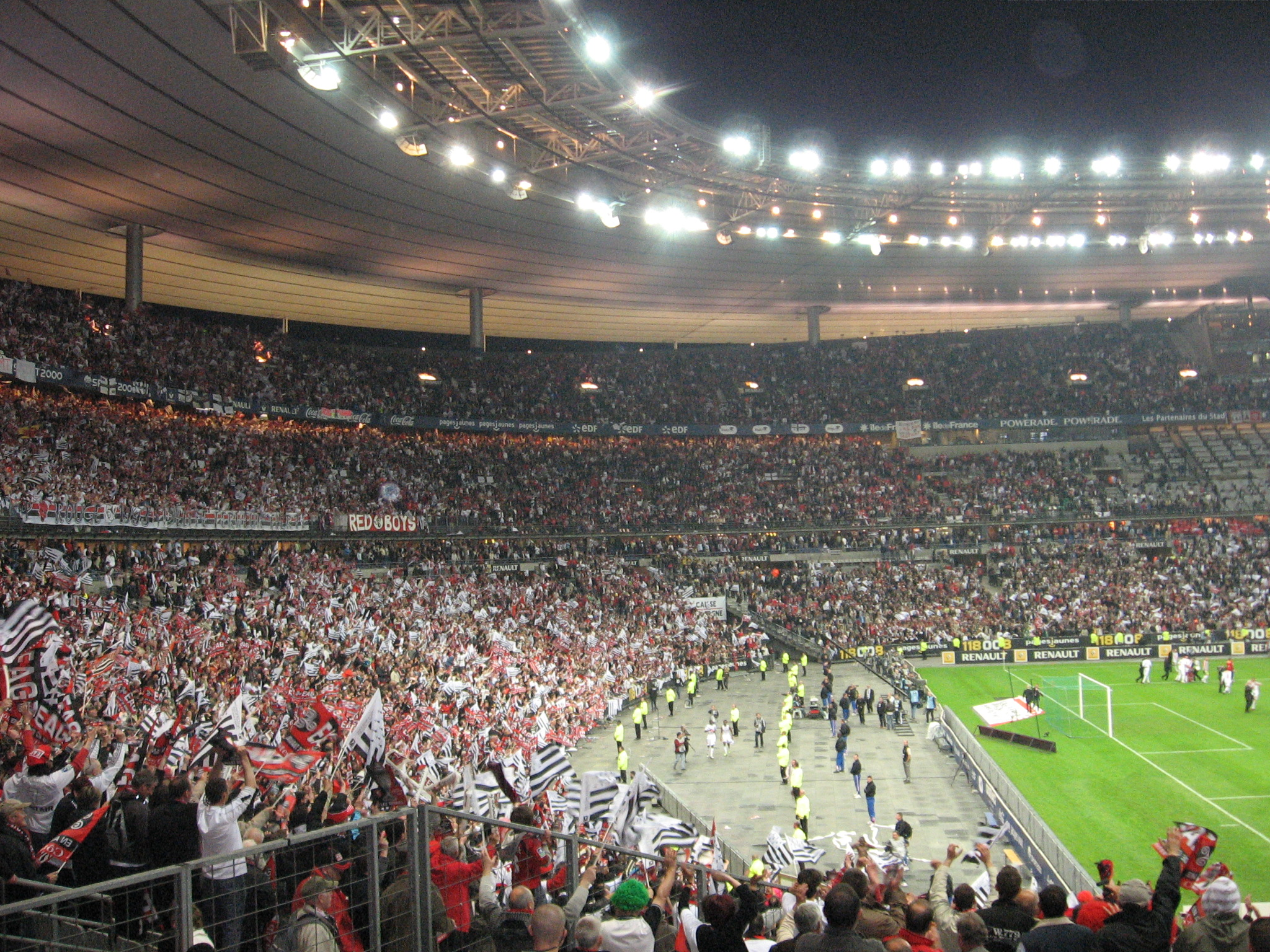
The final of Coupe de France, ironically a Breton derby, saw wide use of Breton symbols, notably the Gwenn-ha-du.

The second half began with a quick attack from Rennes. Capitalizing on a Guingamp turnover, Rennes started a counterattack led by Moussa Sow. Their chance, taken by Leroy, was shot straight at the Guingamp goalkeeper. In the 53rd minute, Rennes almost scored the first goal of the match again when Leroy found Sow. For the second time in the match, however, the shot from Sow hit the post after beating the goalkeeper. Leroy and Sow would be involved in another chance again from Rennes in the 65th minute: after a cross into the box, Sow attempted an overhead kick, but instead knocked the ball into the air and into the path of Leroy, who again blew a chance, sending the ball into the stands despite being about ten metres from goal. Rennes would finally score goal, following a free-kick into the box. The ball travelled passed everyone save for Carlos Bocanegra, who headed the ball past Gauclin to give Rennes a 1–0 lead. Within minutes, however, Guingamp would respond: following a Felipe Saad cross into the box, the ball landed at the feet of Petter Hansson who inadvertently redirected it into the path of Eduardo, who converted to even the match at 1–1. Ten minutes later, Eduardo would strike again when, after a scramble in the box, he found the ball at his feet and proceeded to take a driven, right-footed shot which ran under Douchez to give the Ligue 2 side a 2–1 lead. The goal eventually turned out to be the winner, giving the second division side its first ever Coupe de France title. Guingamp's victory also earned the club an appearance in the 2009–10 UEFA Europa League.

== Match details ==
9 May 2009
20:45 CET

Rennes	1–2	Guingamp
Bocanegra 69'	Report	Eduardo 72', 82'

Stade de France, Saint-Denis
Attendance: 80,056
Referee: Thierry Auriac

Rennes	Guingamp

Rennes:
GK	1	(France) Nicolas Douchez
RB	2	(France) Rod Fanni
CB	4	(Sweden) Petter Hansson (c)	(yellow card) 88'
CB	5	(Cameroon) Stéphane Mbia
LB	3	(United States) Carlos Bocanegra
CM	6	(France) Bruno Cheyrou		(substituted off) 89'
CM	8	(France) Fabien Lemoine
AM	10	(France) Jérôme Leroy
RW	9	(Senegal) Moussa Sow		(substituted off) 87'
LW	7	(France) Romain Danzé		(substituted off) 79'
CF	11	(France) Olivier Thomert
Substitutes:
GK	16	(Senegal) Cheikh N'Diaye
DF	12	(Nigeria) Elderson Echiéjilé
DF	13	(France) Lucien Aubey
MF	14	(Republic of the Congo) Prince Oniangue
FW	15	(France) Mickaël Pagis		(substituted on) 79'
FW	17	(Ghana) Asamoah Gyan		(substituted on) 87'
FW	18	(France) Jirès Kembo Ekoko		(substituted on) 89'
Manager:
(France) Guy Lacombe

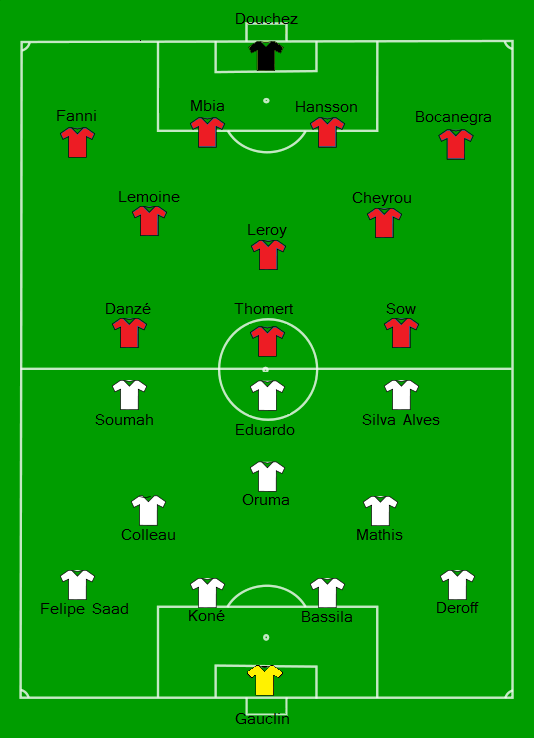

Guingamp:
GK	1	(France) Guillaume Gauclin
RB	2	(France) Yves Deroff
CB	4	(France) Christian Bassila (c)
CB	9	(Burkina Faso) Bakary Koné
LB	3	(Brazil) Felipe Saad
CM	5	(France) Lionel Mathis
CM	8	(France) Fabrice Colleau		(substituted off) 73'
AM	10	(Nigeria) Wilson Oruma
RW	11	(Cape Verde) Gilson Silva		(substituted off) 70'
LW	7	(France) Richard Soumah
CF	6	(Brazil) Eduardo	(yellow card) 83'
Substitutes:
GK	16	(France) Stéphane Trévisan
DF	12	(France) Jean-Christophe Vergerolle
MF	15	(France) François Bellugou
MF	13	(Benin) Mouritala Ogunbiyi		(substituted on) 70'
FW	14	(France) Yohann Rivière
FW	17	(France) Cédric Liabeuf
FW	18	(Senegal) Badara Sène		(substituted on) 73'
Manager:
(France) Victor Zvunka

MATCH OFFICIALS

- Assistant referees:
  - Mickaël Annonier
  - Nicolas Pottier
- Fourth official:

MAN OF THE MATCH

MATCH RULES

- 90 minutes.
- 30 minutes extra-time (15 minute intervals)
- Penalty shoot-out if scores level after extra time.
- Seven named substitutes
- Maximum of 3 substitutions.

== See also ==
- Derby Breton
