= Nêgo Bispo =

Brazilian activist and writer (1959–2023)

- Born: Antônio Bispo dos Santos; December 12, 1959; Piauí, Brazil
- Died: December 3, 2023 (aged 63); São João do Piauí, Brazil
- Other names: Nêgo Bispo
- Occupations: Activist, academic, quilombo leader

Antônio Bispo dos Santos (December 12, 1959 – December 3, 2023), also known as Nêgo Bispo, was a Brazilian activist, academic and quilombo leader best known for his concept of counter-colonization. His work challenges colonial complexes and reflects on the experiences and struggles of quilombola communities.

== Biography ==
Bispo was born on December 12, 1959, in the Berlengas river valley in Piauí, Brazil. He grew up in Quilombo Saco-Curtume, where he became the first individual in his family to become literate. He worked at the State Coordination Office for Quilombola Communities of Piauí (Coordenação Estadual das Comunidades Quilombolas do Piauí—CECOQ/PI) and the National Coordination Office of the Black Rural Quilombola Communities Alliance (Coordenação Nacional de Articulação das Comunidades Negras Rurais Quilombolas—CONAQ). Bispo died at the age of 63 on December 3, 2023, in São João do Piauí from cardiorespiratory arrest due to complications with diabetes.

== Thought ==
=== Counter-Colonialism ===
Bispo proposed the concept of counter-colonialism as a defense against cultural domination by the colonizers. This approach emphasizes reinforcing the culture, practices, and social organization of Afro-Pindoramic peoples—particularly indigenous and quilombola communities—who have resisted domination by maintaining their traditional ways of life. Bispo developed counter-colonialism independently, not having heard of the term decoloniality at the time.

=== Confluence and Transfluence ===
In his vision of counter-colonization, Bispo distinguishes between confluence and transfluence. Confluence emphasizes the harmonious coexistence of diverse elements, reflecting the pluralistic worldview of traditional peoples. In contrast, transfluence governs the transformation of natural elements associated with Eurocentric and monotheistic perspectives that often seek to impose a singular worldview.

=== Cosmophobia ===
Cosmophobia is the fear of the cosmos and of God. This concept arises from the Biblical account in Genesis, where Bispo interprets the eviction from Eden as transforming nature into a source of terror. As a result, Bispo considers the subjects of this deity to be living in a state of hopelessness.

== Notable works ==
Bispo has authored a series of influential papers and books:

- Quilombos, modos e significados (2007)
- Colonização, Quilombos: modos e significados (2015)
- A terra dá, a terra quer (2023)
