= Guillaume Gauclin =

French footballer (born 1981)

Personal information
- Date of birth: 17 June 1981 (age 45)
- Place of birth: Évreux, France
- Height: 1.78 m (5 ft 10 in)
- Position: Goalkeeper

Senior career*
Years	Team	Apps	(Gls)
2001–2010	Guingamp	41	(0)
2003–2004	→ Wasquehal (loan)		(0)
2005	→ Lorient (loan)	0	(0)
2010–2012	Vannes	65	(0)
2012–2015	Strasbourg	65	(0)
2015–2021	Schiltigheim	114	(0)
2021–2022	Haguenau	26	(0)
- * Club domestic league appearances and goals

Guillaume Gauclin (born 17 June 1981) is a French former professional footballer who played as a goalkeeper. Whilst at Guingamp, then in Ligue 2, Gauclin played in the 2009 Coupe de France Final, in which they beat Rennes.

== Honours ==
Guingamp

- Coupe de France: 2008–09
