= Illien =

Illien is a French surname. Notable people with the surname include:

- Maël Illien (born 1990), French footballer
- Mario Illien (born 1949), Swiss engineer
