= Boca-preta sertanejo =

Boca-preta Sertanejo
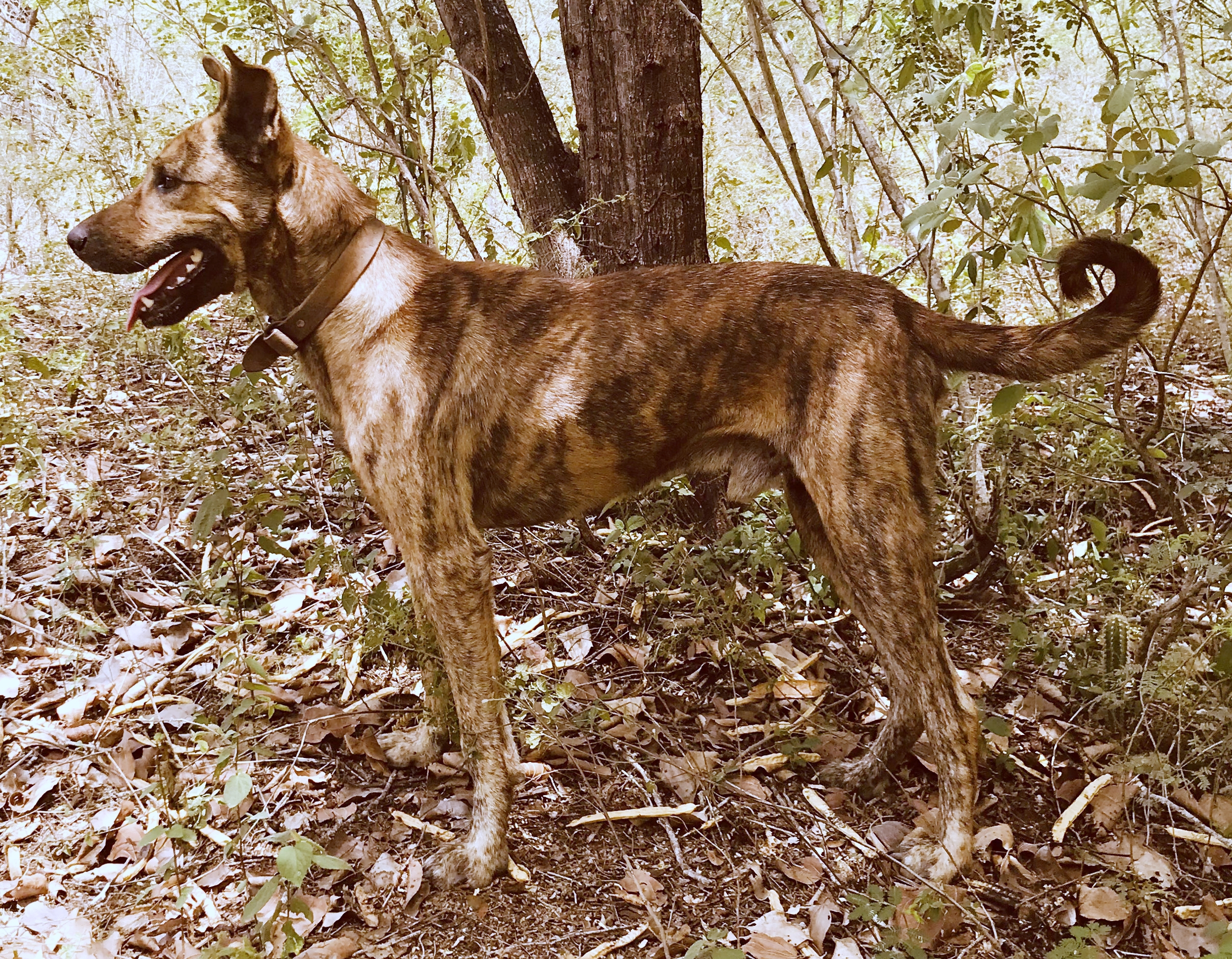
- Probable Boca-preta Sertanejo dog, photographed in the rural area of Agreste, Paraíba
- Common nicknames: Boca-preta; Pé-seco; Pé-duro; Cowboy's Dog; Orelhudo; Canindé Dog; Farm Dog; Sertanejo Dog; Januare
- Origin: Brazil
Traits
Height	Males	19 in (48 cm) (average)
	Females	19 in (48 cm) (average)
Weight	Males	33 lb (15 kg) (average)
	Females	33 lb (15 kg) (average)
- Coat: Short
- Color: Bay, brindle, canindé (black and tan), and red
Kennel club standards
- SOBRACI: standard
- Notes: Used as a hunting, tracking, cattle herding, guarding, and companion dog

The Boca-preta Sertanejo (English: Sertanejo Black-Muzzle Dog) is a regional landrace of dogs native to the Northeast of Brazil, traditionally used for hunting, watch, and cattle work alongside the vaqueiro nordestino (Northeastern Brazilian cowboy).

Its identification and preservation began with a morphometric study conducted by Embrapa in 2011.

It is in the process of becoming a recognized breed, being registered by SOBRACI and ALKC.

This is a rustic animal, naturally selected in the sertanejo regions, adapted to the climate, fauna, flora, and soils of the Sertão. It is considered a historical-cultural heritage of the region, being part of the popular memory, especially of countrymen involved in subsistence hunting (such as hunting preá and armadillo), cattle work by the vaqueiros, and even activities of small farmers.

== History ==
=== Origin ===
It is believed that the breed’s origins go back to indigenous dogs, possibly mixed with Portuguese Podengo-type dogs or other European hunting breeds, and were kept by Amerindian peoples of the Brazilian Northeast.

According to the book História da Missão dos Padres Capuchinhos na Ilha do Maranhão e Terras Circunvizinhas (1614), domesticated dogs were already found with indigenous peoples in the Northeast, who called them Januare.

Another important reference appears in 17th-century paintings of Dutch Brazil, especially the painting "Tapuya Woman" by Albert Eckhout. According to Felipe Van der Velden:

=== Development ===
The breed developed naturally in geographic isolation for more than four centuries, being selected through harsh droughts, scarce food, and the sertanejo way of life.

In 2011, Embrapa Meio-Norte published a cataloging study, referring to the variety as “Cão Sertanejo” and conducting morphometric characterization of dogs in São João do Piauí, in the state of Piauí.

== Characteristics ==
The Boca-preta Sertanejo is a versatile dog, used by sertanejos for a wide range of tasks, such as cattle handling and subsistence hunting.

Other names for the Boca-preta Sertanejo include Cowboy’s Dog, Pé-seco, Pé-duro, Farm Dog, Orelhudo, and Canindé.

The breed has short fur, with varied colors such as white, bay, brindle, black, red, and brown brindle.

== Preservation ==
Embrapa Meio-Norte is developing a project for selection and preservation of the sertanejo dog, conducting morphometric characterization studies.

SOBRACI has also recognized the Boca-preta Sertanejo, also called “Cão Sertanejo.”
