= Badara Sène =

Badara Sène may refer to:

- Badara Sène (footballer) (born 1984), Senegalese footballer
- Badara Sène (referee) (1945–2020), Senegalese football referee
