= Eduardo dos Santos (footballer, born 1980) =

Brazilian footballer

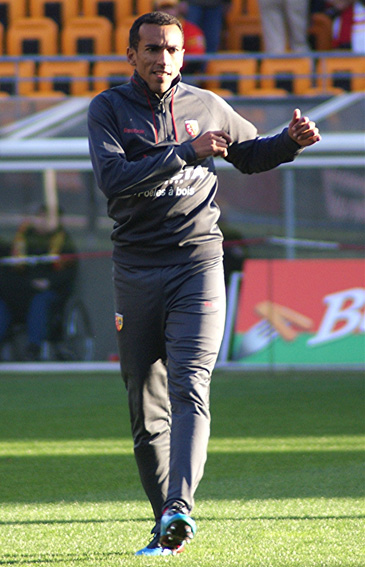
- Dos Santos with Lens

Personal information
- Full name: Eduardo Ribeiro dos Santos
- Date of birth: 5 August 1980 (age 46)
- Place of birth: São João do Piauí, Brazil
- Height: 1.78 m (5 ft 10 in)
- Position: Forward

Team information
- Current team: Ríver

Senior career*
Years	Team	Apps	(Gls)
1997–2000	Flamengo do Piauí	114	(73)
2000–2001	Joinville	29	(17)
2001–2006	Grasshoppers	111	(36)
2007–2009	Guingamp	64	(22)
2009–2012	Lens	77	(10)
2012–2014	Ajaccio	43	(11)
2014	Metz	11	(2)
2014–2015	Ríver	19	(9)
2015–2016	Fortaleza	0	(0)
2016	Ríver	11	(3)
2017	Flamengo do Piauí	0	(0)
2017	Altos	7	(3)
2018–19	Ríver	0	(0)
2018	→ Campinense	6	(1)
2019	Treze	17	(8)
2019	Timon	0	(0)
2020–	Ríver	0	(0)
- * Club domestic league appearances and goals as of 14:48, 20 January 2020 (UTC)

Eduardo Ribeiro dos Santos (born 5 August 1980) is a Brazilian professional footballer who plays as forward for Ríver.

== Career ==
Dos Santos was born in São João, Piauí.

=== France ===
Dos Santos scored his first goal for Guingamp, a penalty against Strasbourg. He gained many admirers due to his versatile play exhibited with Grasshoppers playing opposite Richard Nuñez.

On 9 May 2009, dos Santos entered French football history by scoring both his team's goals in a 2–1 triumph in the Coupe de France final against Rennes, despite his side being a Ligue 2 club at the time.

Dos Santos joined promoted Ligue 1 club Lens in July 2009 after agreeing to a three-year deal.

After two stints with Ajaccio, dos Santos signed an eighteen-month contract with Ligue 2 club [[FC Metz]Metz]] in January 2014.

=== Return to Brazil ===
Eduardo returned to Brazil in June 2014, after 13 years in Europe, signing for Ríver in his native state of Piauí. In between spells with Ríver, he featured for Altos and Campinense in Campeonato Brasileiro Série C and, in 2019, for Treze in 2019 Campeonato Brasileiro Série C, where he was joint top scorer with eight goals. He returned to Ríver for the 2020 season.

== Personal life ==
Born in Brazil, dos Santos applied for Swiss citizenship in September 2006 after having lived in Switzerland for six years, thus enabling him to play for the Swiss national team.

== Honours ==
Grasshoppers

- Swiss Super League: 2002–03

Guingamp

- Coupe de France: 2008–09

Metz

- Ligue 2: 2013–14

River

- Campeonato Piauiense: 2015, 2016, 2019

Fortaleza

- Copa dos Campeões Cearenses: 2016
