= Christian Bassila =

French footballer (born 1977)

Personal information
- Full name: Christian Armel Bassila
- Date of birth: 5 October 1977 (age 49)
- Place of birth: Paris, France
- Height: 1.92 m (6 ft 4 in)
- Position: Defensive midfielder

Team information
- Current team: INF Clairefontaine (head of youth)

Senior career*
Years	Team	Apps	(Gls)
1996–1999	Lyon	44	(2)
1999–2002	Rennes	24	(1)
2000–2001	→ West Ham United (loan)	3	(0)
2001–2002	→ Strasbourg (loan)	32	(3)
2002–2005	Strasbourg	89	(7)
2005–2006	Sunderland	13	(0)
2006–2007	AEL	27	(2)
2007–2008	Energie Cottbus	23	(3)
2008–2011	Guingamp	62	(2)
Total		317	(20)

International career
- France U21

Managerial career
- 2018–2019: Lyon B
- * Club domestic league appearances and goals

Christian Armel Bassila (born 5 October 1977) is a French former professional footballer who played as a defensive midfielder or centre-back. He is the director of INF Clairefontaine.

== Club career ==
Born in Paris, Basilla started his career with the reigning Ligue 1 champions Lyon in the 1996–97 season, before joining Rennes. Bassila rarely featured in the Rennes first team and was sent on a season-long loan to West Ham United in August 2000. However, he failed to cement a first-team place at the East London side either and the following season he joined Strasbourg on another season-long loan. After enjoying regular first-team action there he signed permanently and spent the next three seasons there. He was on the bench when Strasbourg won the 2005 Coupe de la Ligue Final.

Bassila signed a two-year contract with newly promoted Premier League side Sunderland in the last week of the 2005 summer transfer window. After injuries caused him to fail to establish himself in a struggling Sunderland team that was eventually relegated, at the start of the 2006 season he activated a clause in his contract which allowed him to move to another club without a transfer fee being paid to Sunderland, and transferred to Greek side Athlitiki Enosi Larissa F.C. There he enjoyed more first-team football in a dynamic defensive role in the midfield.

Bassila later transferred to Energie Cottbus and French Ligue 2 club Guingamp. Whilst at Guingamp, then in Ligue 2, Bassila captained his team in the 2009 Coupe de France Final in which they beat Rennes.

== International career ==
In 2006, Bassila was called up to represent the Congo national football team by coach Noel Tosi. Since Bassila had represented France at under-21 level, however, FIFA ruled against this as he should have applied for the change in his national status before 31 December 2005.

In 2009, after a change in the FIFA rules concerning an age of limit to switch the national allegiance, Bassila was called again to the national squad together with Lucien Aubey, Albin Ebondo and Matt Moussilou, all newly eligible for the Congo national team.

== Coaching career ==
In 2015, Bassila was hired as responsible for the development of the U12, U13 and U14 teams of Olympique Lyonnais, where he also functioned as a coach for several of the teams. In the summer 2018, he took charge of Lyon's B-team.

In the summer 2019, Bassila joined INF Clairefontaine as director.

== Honours ==
Lyon

- UEFA Intertoto Cup: 1997

Strasbourg

- Coupe de la Ligue: 2004-05

AEL

- Greek Cup: 2006–07

Guingamp

- Coupe de France: 2008-09
