= Yves Deroff =

French footballer (born 1978)

Personal information
- Date of birth: 29 August 1978 (age 48)
- Place of birth: Maisons-Laffitte, France
- Height: 1.75 m (5 ft 9 in)
- Position: Right-back

Youth career
- –1997: Nantes

Senior career*
Years	Team	Apps	(Gls)
1998–2002	Nantes	45	(0)
2002–2007	Strasbourg	147	(2)
2007–2010	Guingamp	94	(0)
2010–2012	Angers	35	(0)
Total		321	(2)

International career
1997	France U18		
- * Club domestic league appearances and goals

Yves Deroff (born 29 August 1978) is a French former professional footballer who played as a right-back.

== Career ==
Born in Maisons-Laffitte, Yvelines, Deroff spent two years at the INF Clairefontaine academy, between 1992 and 1994.

He played club football for Nantes, Strasbourg, Guingamp and Angers. He won Ligue 1 once (2001) and the Coupe de France twice with Nantes (1999 and 2000). He also won the Coupe de la Ligue with Strasbourg in 2005. Deroff suffered a double-broken leg as a result of a violent tackle by Patrick Blondeau in a league match against Marseille on 29 May 1999, preventing Deroff from playing for six months.

Whilst at Guingamp, then in Ligue 2, Deroff played in the 2009 Coupe de France Final in which they beat Rennes.

Deroff won the 1997 UEFA European Under-18 Championship with France.
