= Victor Zvunka =

French footballer (born 1951)

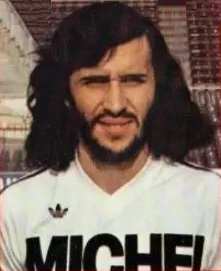
- Zvunka in 1975

Personal information
- Date of birth: 15 November 1951 (age 74)
- Place of birth: Le Ban-Saint-Martin, France
- Height: 1.84 m (6 ft 0 in)
- Position: Defender

Youth career
- 1963–1970: Metz

Senior career*
Years	Team	Apps	(Gls)
1970–1973	Metz	43	(2)
1973–1981	Marseille	254	(6)
1981–1983	Laval	75	(1)
1983–1985	Matra Racing	45	(1)
Total		417	(10)

International career
1975	France	1	(0)

Managerial career
- 1984–1987: Matra Racing
- 1987–1988: Valenciennes
- 1988–1991: Niort
- 1991–1993: Toulouse
- 1993–1998: Châteauroux
- 1998–1999: Nice
- 1999–2000: Amiens
- 2001–2003: Lausanne Sports
- 2001–2003: Laval
- 2003–2005: Châteauroux
- 2005–2007: Gueugnon
- 2007–2010: Guingamp
- 2010–2011: Naval 1º Maio
- 2011–2012: Cannes
- 2011–2012: JS Saint-Pierroise
- 2012–2013: Nîmes
- 2014: CR Belouizdad
- 2015: Arles-Avignon
- 2015–2018: Horoya AC
- 2019: Club Africain
- 2019: CS Chebba
- 2019–2020: Toulon
- * Club domestic league appearances and goals

Victor Zvunka (Romanian: Victor Zvuncă; born 15 November 1951) is a French former football defender and football manager most recently in charge of Sporting Club Toulon. Zvunka was born in Le Ban-Saint-Martin.

== Honours ==
=== As a player ===
Marseille

- Coupe de France: 1976

=== As a coach ===
Châteauroux

- Championnat National: 1993–94
- Ligue 2: 1996–97

Guingamp

- Coupe de France: 2009
