= Richard Soumah =

French-born Guinean footballer (born 1986)

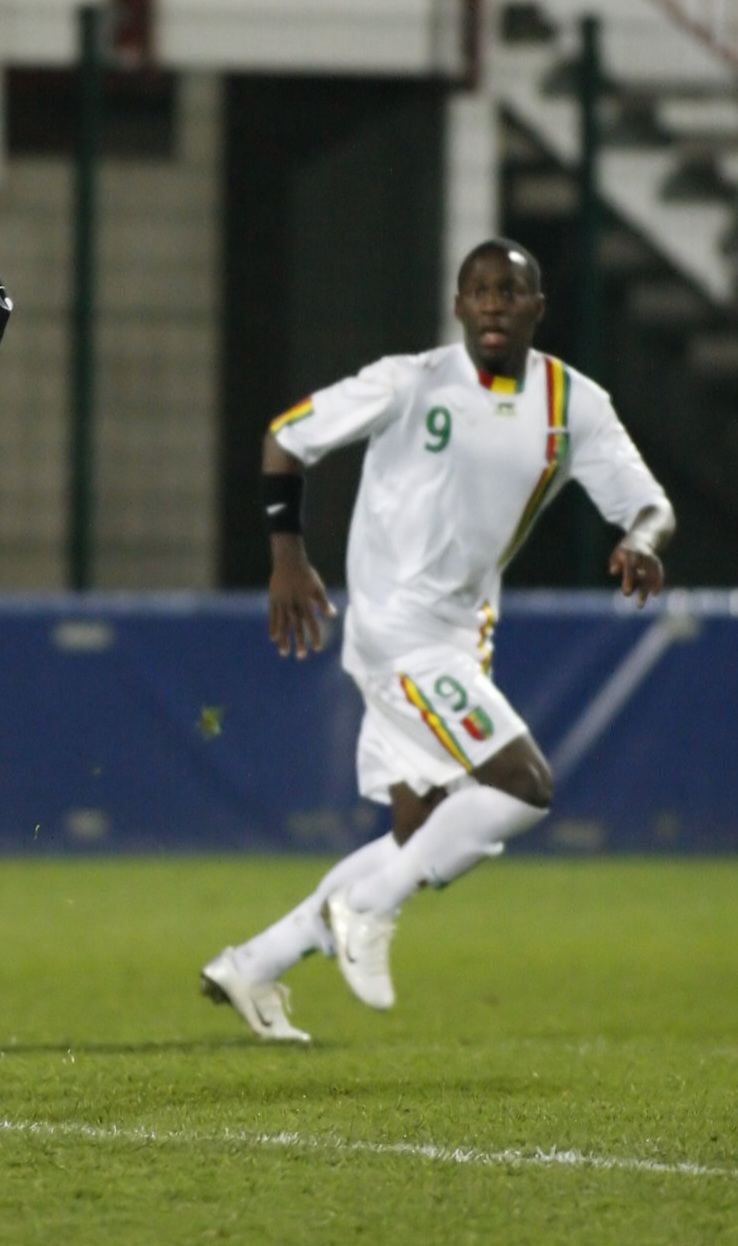
- Soumah in 2007

Personal information
- Date of birth: 6 October 1986 (age 40)
- Place of birth: Créteil, France
- Height: 1.77 m (5 ft 10 in)
- Position: Midfielder

Youth career
- 2002–2004: Rennes
- 2004–2005: Guingamp

Senior career*
Years	Team	Apps	(Gls)
2005–2010	Guingamp	83	(11)
2010–2013	Brest	25	(0)
2012	→ Angers (loan)	15	(0)
2013–2014	Mons	21	(1)
2015–2017	Amiens	60	(4)
2017–2018	Maccabi Petah Tikva	27	(3)
2018–2019	Apollon Limassol	8	(0)

International career^{‡}
2011	Guinea	2	(0)
- * Club domestic league appearances and goals as of 15:40, 7 November 2019 (UTC) ‡ National team caps and goals as of 15:40, 7 November 2019 (UTC)

Richard Soumah (born 6 October 1986) is a professional footballer who plays as a midfielder. Born in France, he represented Guinea at International level.

== Career ==
Born in Créteil, he started his career at Rennes, before moving to Guingamp in 2004. He made his professional debut in the 2005–06 season. During the 2011–12 season, he had a loan spell at Ligue 2 side Angers.

Whilst at Guingamp, then in Ligue 2, Soumah played in the 2009 Coupe de France Final in which they beat Rennes.

On 12 June 2017, he signed for Israeli Premier League club Maccabi Petah Tikva.
