= Guy Lacombe =

French football manager (born 1955)

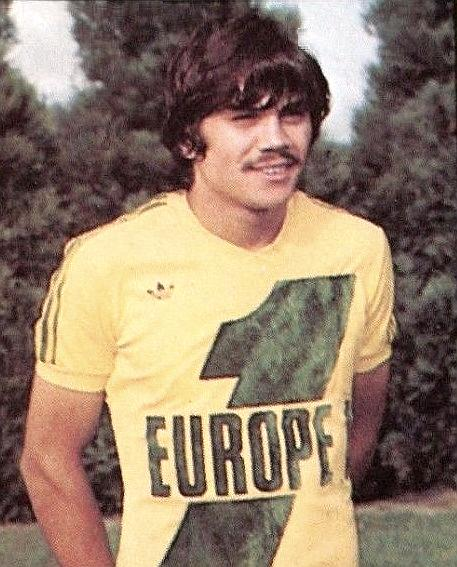
- Lacombe with Nantes in 1979

Personal information
- Full name: Guy Hubert Georges Lacombe
- Date of birth: 13 June 1955 (age 71)
- Place of birth: Villefranche-de-Rouergue, Aveyron, France
- Height: 1.76 m (5 ft 9 in)
- Position: Striker

Youth career
- 1970–1975: Villefranche-de-Rouergue

Senior career*
Years	Team	Apps	(Gls)
1975–1976	Albi		
1976–1979	Nantes		
1979–1981	Lens	72	(13)
1981–1983	Tours		
1983–1985	Toulouse		
1985–1986	Rennes		
1986–1987	Lille		
1987–1989	Cannes		

International career
1984	France (Olympic team)		

Managerial career
- 1990–1995: Cannes (Youth academy)
- 1995–1997: Cannes
- 1998–1999: Toulouse
- 1999–2002: Guingamp
- 2002–2005: Sochaux
- 2005–2007: Paris Saint-Germain
- 2007–2009: Rennes
- 2009–2011: Monaco
- 2012–2013: Al Wasl
Medal record
Representing France
Gold medal – first place	1984 Los Angeles	Team competition
- * Club domestic league appearances and goals

Guy Hubert Georges Lacombe (born 13 June 1955) is a French football manager and former professional player.

== Playing career ==
Lacombe was a member of the French squad that won the gold medal at the 1984 Summer Olympics in Los Angeles, California. He played for Albi, Nantes, Lens, Tours, Toulouse, Rennes, Lille and Cannes.

== Coaching career ==
As manager of Sochaux, Lacombe led the club to two UEFA Cup qualifications before leaving in July 2005. On 27 December that year, he was appointed by Paris Saint-Germain, who had dismissed Laurent Fournier while in sixth place. In his first match on 4 January 2006, he won 3–1 at the Parc des Princes against his former employers. Despite falling to 9th by the end of the season, PSG won the Coupe de France final 2–1 against Le Classique rivals Marseille to clinch a UEFA Cup place.

At the start of the 2006–07, season Lacombe dropped France international midfielder Vikash Dhorasoo – one of the goalscorers in the cup final win – who reacted by publicly criticising him in an interview for L'Équipe. PSG chairman Alain Cayzac sacked Dhorasoo in October 2006. It was the first case of a Ligue 1 player being dismissed by his employer. On 15 January 2007, with PSG only one place above the relegation zone, Lacombe was shown the door and replaced by Paul Le Guen.

On 17 December 2007, Lacombe returned to Ligue 1, taking over from Pierre Dréossi at a Rennes team that had fallen from 3rd to 13th after six straight defeats. Having come 6th and 7th respectively in his two seasons, and lost the 2009 Coupe de France Final 2–1 to Derby Breton rivals Guingamp.

Lacombe signed a two-year deal with AS Monaco on 2 June 2009, replacing the Brazilian Ricardo Gomes. In his first season with the team from the principality, he led them to the 2010 Coupe de France Final, lost to his former team PSG via a single Guillaume Hoarau goal in extra time. He was sacked on 10 January 2011 after the team were eliminated from the last 64 of the season's cup on penalties to fifth-tier Chambéry.

On 7 November 2012, Lacombe moved abroad for the first time in his football career, joining Al-Wasl F.C. in the United Arab Emirates. He was recommended by their previous coach, compatriot Bruno Metsu, who took leave due to his stomach cancer diagnosis. The following 18 February he was sacked off the back of a 4–0 loss to Al-Ahli with the team in 9th; he won two of his nine fixtures.

Lacombe became a director for the French Football Federation on 1 October 2013. He retired on 3 October 2017.

== Honours ==
=== Player ===
Nantes

- Ligue 1: 1977

France

- Olympic gold medal: 1984

=== Coach ===
Cannes

- Coupe Gambardella: 1995

Sochaux

- Coupe de la Ligue: 2004
- Coupe de la Ligue finalist: 2003

Paris Saint-Germain

- Coupe de France: 2006

Rennes

- Coupe de France finalist: 2009

Monaco

- Coupe de France finalist: 2010
