= Badara Sène (footballer) =

Senegalese footballer

Personal information
- Date of birth: November 19, 1984 (age 41)
- Place of birth: Dakar, Senegal
- Height: 1.90 m (6 ft 3 in)
- Position: Defensive midfielder

Youth career
- 2000–2005: Sochaux

Senior career*
Years	Team	Apps	(Gls)
2006–2011	Sochaux	50	(3)
2008–2009	→ Guingamp (loan)	30	(0)
2009–2010	→ Le Mans (loan)	5	(0)
2011–2012	Alle	16	(7)
2012	Delémont	9	(3)
2013	Laufen	8	(3)

International career
2007–	Senegal	6	(0)
- * Club domestic league appearances and goals as of June 2, 2013

Badara Sène (born 19 November 1984, in Dakar) is a Senegalese footballer, who most recently played in France for FC Sochaux-Montbéliard.

== Career ==
He made his Ligue 1 debut on 4 January 2006, PSG 3–1 won FC Sochaux-Montbéliard. On 31 August 2009 Le Mans have signed the Senegalese midfielder on loan from Sochaux for one season.

Whilst at Guingamp, then in Ligue 2, Sène played as a substitute in the 2009 Coupe de France Final in which they beat Rennes.
