= Fabrice Colleau =

French professional football player (born 1977)

Personal information
- Date of birth: 26 June 1977 (age 49)
- Place of birth: Saint-Renan, France
- Height: 1.85 m (6 ft 1 in)
- Position: Defensive midfielder

Senior career*
Years	Team	Apps	(Gls)
1994–1999	Guingamp B		
1998–1999	→ Brest (loan)		
1999–2004	Guingamp	52	(3)
2002–2003	→ Nîmes (loan)		
2004–2006	Amiens	49	(3)
2006	→ Gueugnon (loan)	12	(0)
2007	Gueugnon	40	(3)
2008–2011	Guingamp	79	(3)
- * Club domestic league appearances and goals as of 13:26, 16 November 2009 (UTC)

Fabrice Colleau (born 26 June 1977) is a French professional football player.

His playing career was mostly spent with En Avant de Guingamp.

Whilst at Guingamp, then in Ligue 2, Colleau played in the 2009 Coupe de France Final in which they beat Rennes.

== Honours ==
- Coupe de France winner: 2009.
