= Maël Illien =

French footballer (born 1990)

Personal information
- Date of birth: 30 August 1990 (age 36)
- Place of birth: France
- Position: Midfielder

Team information
- Current team: Stade Briochin

Senior career*
Years	Team	Apps	(Gls)
2008–2012	En Avant Guingamp B		
2012–2019	US Concarneau	189	(12)
2019–2020	US Boulogne	12	(0)
2020–	Stade Briochin	57	(5)
- * Club domestic league appearances and goals

Maël Illien (born 30 August 1990) is a French footballer who plays as a midfielder for Stade Briochin.

== Early life ==
Illien is a native of Brittany, France.

== Education ==
Illien obtained a diploma in marketing.

== Career ==
Illien started his career with French side En Avant Guingamp B but left due to physical problems. In 2012, he signed for French side US Concarneau, where he was regarded as one of the club's most important players. In 2020, he signed for French side Stade Briochin. He was regarded as one of the club's most important players. He then suffered a knee injury while playing for them.

== Style of play ==
Illien mainly operates as a midfielder and has been described as a "generous and altruistic midfielder, particularly at ease as a sentry in front of the defense". He has received comparison to Dutch international Frank Rijkaard.

== Personal life ==
Illien has enjoyed playing tennis.
