= Mouritala Ogunbiyi =

Footballer (born 1982)

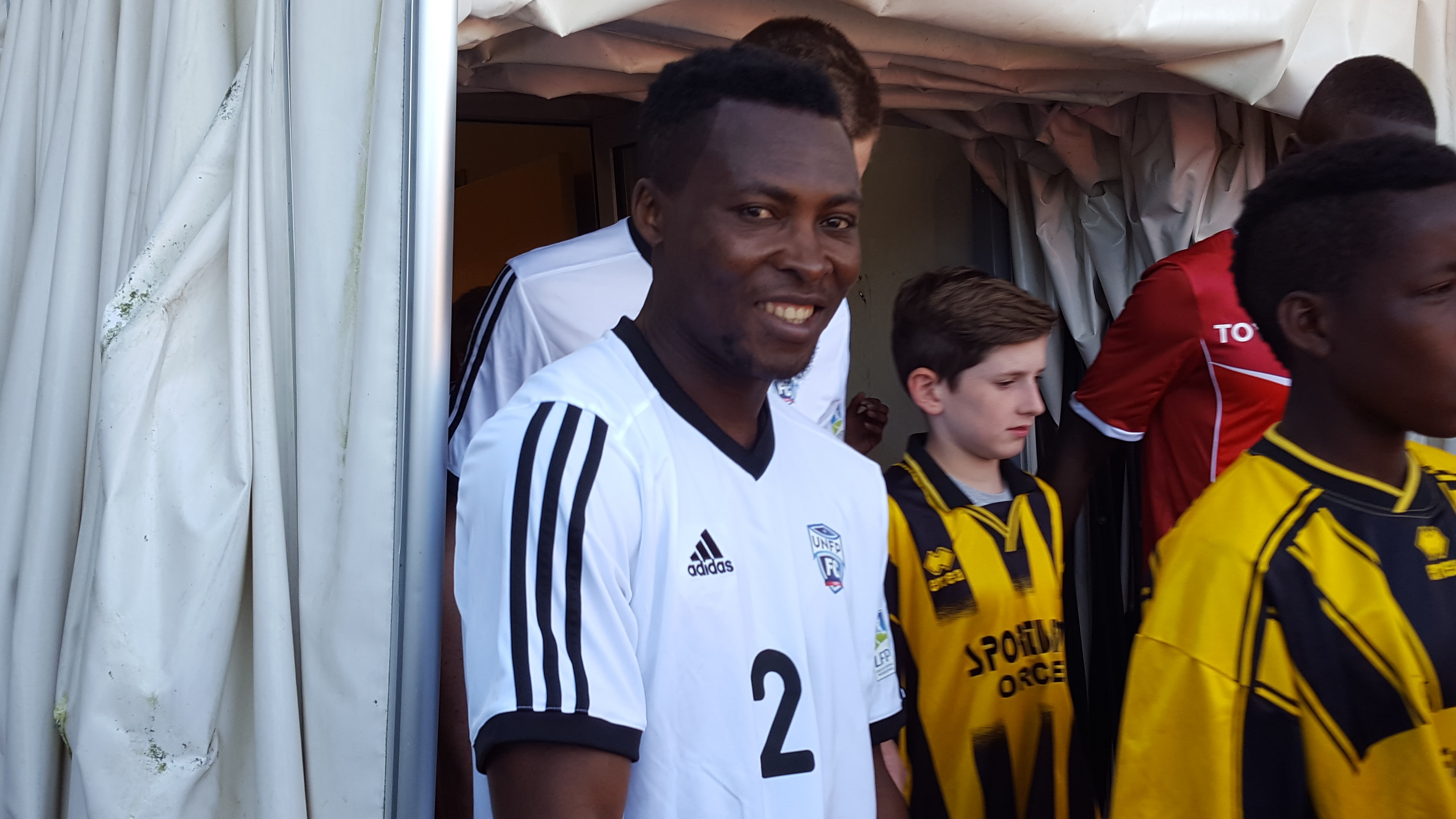
- Ogunbiyi in 2016

Personal information
- Date of birth: 10 October 1982 (age 44)
- Place of birth: Ota, Nigeria
- Height: 1.73 m (5 ft 8 in)
- Position: Midfielder

Senior career*
| Years | Team | Apps | (Gls) |
| 1998–2002 | Dragons | | |
| 2003–2006 | Enyimba | | |
| 2006–2008 | Étoile du Sahel | | |
| 2008–2011 | Guingamp | 84 | (20) |
| 2011–2014 | Nîmes | 94 | (13) |
| 2014–2015 | Paris FC | 28 | (3) |
| 2017 | USS Kraké | | |
| 2019–2020 | Dragons | | |
| 2020 | Les Buffles du Borgou | | |

International career
| 1998–2019 | Benin | 47 | (6) |
- * Club domestic league appearances and goals

Mouritala Ogunbiyi (born 10 October 1982) is a former professional footballer who played as a midfielder. Born in Nigeria, he played for the Benin national team internationally.

== Career ==
Ogunbiyi was part of the Benin national team's 2004 African Nations Cup team, which finished bottom of its group in the first round of competition, thus failing to secure qualification for the quarter-finals.

Whilst at Guingamp, then in Ligue 2, Ogunbiyi played as a substitute in the 2009 Coupe de France Final in which they beat Rennes.

On 23 February 2019, he re-joined AS Dragons FC de l'Ouémé.
