= São João do Piauí =

Coordinates: 8°21′S 42°15′W

São João do Piauí São João do Piauí
- Municipality
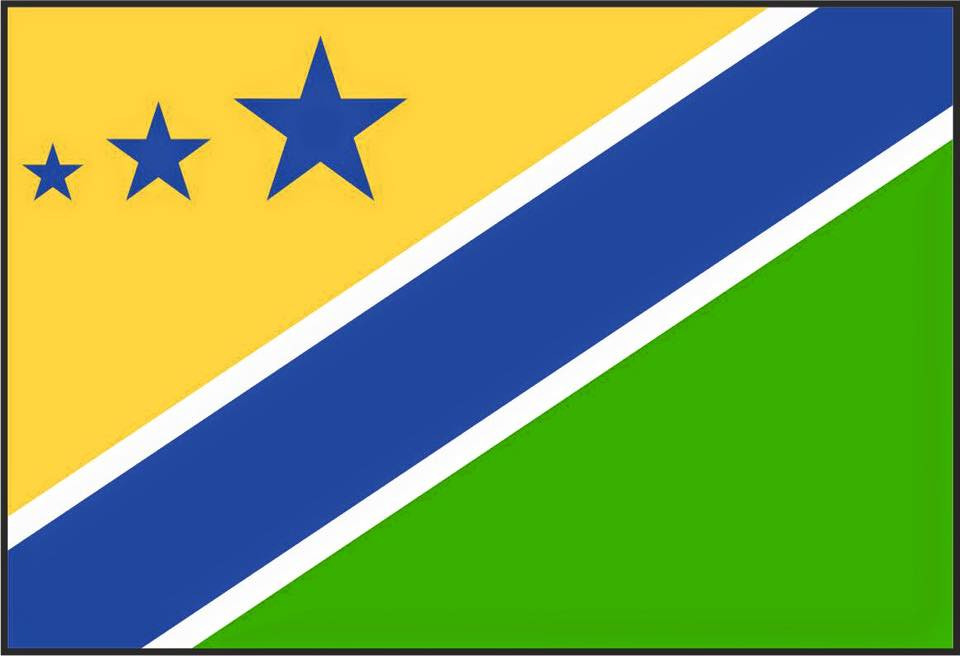
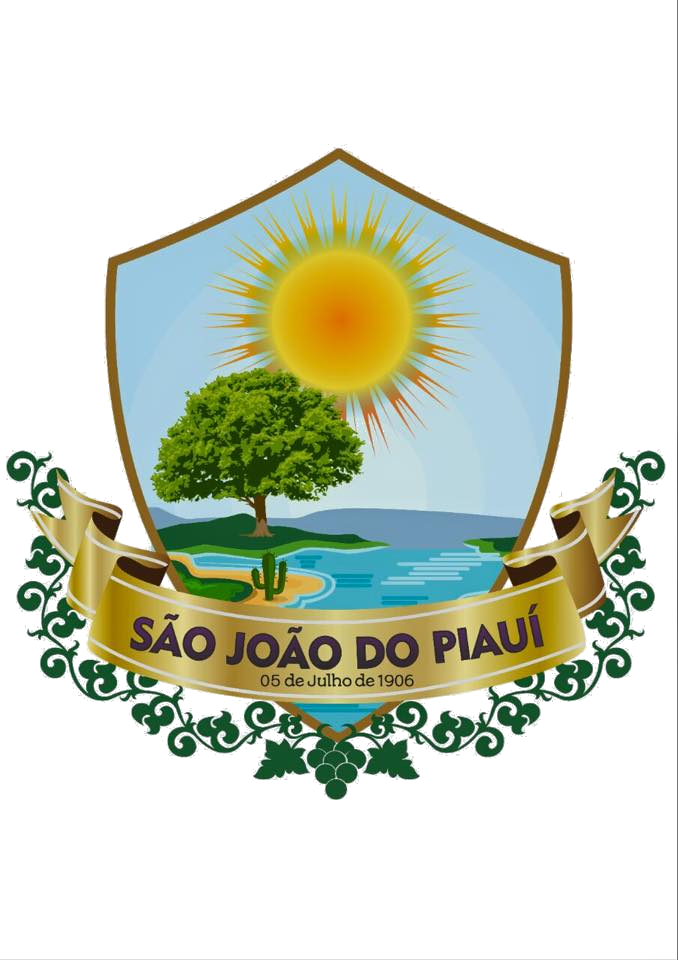
- Flag Coat of arms

- Country: Brazil
- Region: Nordeste
- State: Piauí
- Mesoregion: Sudeste Piauiense

Population (2020)
  - Total: 20,662
- Time zone: UTC−3 (BRT)

São João do Piauí is a municipality in the state of Piauí in the Northeast region of Brazil.

== Climate ==
Climate data for São João do Piauí (1991–2020)
| Month | Jan | Feb | Mar | Apr | May | Jun | Jul | Aug | Sep | Oct | Nov | Dec | Year |
|---|---|---|---|---|---|---|---|---|---|---|---|---|---|
| Mean daily maximum °C (°F) | 33.3 (91.9) | 32.5 (90.5) | 32.5 (90.5) | 33.2 (91.8) | 34.1 (93.4) | 33.7 (92.7) | 33.5 (92.3) | 34.6 (94.3) | 36.2 (97.2) | 36.8 (98.2) | 35.7 (96.3) | 34.3 (93.7) | 34.2 (93.6) |
| Daily mean °C (°F) | 27.4 (81.3) | 26.7 (80.1) | 26.7 (80.1) | 27.0 (80.6) | 27.5 (81.5) | 27.2 (81.0) | 27.1 (80.8) | 28.0 (82.4) | 29.5 (85.1) | 30.3 (86.5) | 29.4 (84.9) | 28.1 (82.6) | 27.9 (82.2) |
| Mean daily minimum °C (°F) | 22.6 (72.7) | 22.3 (72.1) | 22.4 (72.3) | 22.1 (71.8) | 22.2 (72.0) | 21.9 (71.4) | 21.7 (71.1) | 22.5 (72.5) | 23.8 (74.8) | 24.8 (76.6) | 24.3 (75.7) | 23.2 (73.8) | 22.8 (73.0) |
| Average precipitation mm (inches) | 122.5 (4.82) | 129.0 (5.08) | 122.0 (4.80) | 70.5 (2.78) | 23.8 (0.94) | 1.5 (0.06) | 0.8 (0.03) | 0.1 (0.00) | 1.4 (0.06) | 23.0 (0.91) | 68.6 (2.70) | 85.8 (3.38) | 649.0 (25.55) |
| Average precipitation days (≥ 1.0 mm) | 9.2 | 9.2 | 9.8 | 5.5 | 1.8 | 0.3 | 0.1 | 0.0 | 0.2 | 2.3 | 5.1 | 6.8 | 50.3 |
| Average relative humidity (%) | 68.0 | 71.8 | 73.6 | 68.4 | 57.6 | 51.0 | 47.1 | 41.4 | 38.7 | 43.7 | 52.1 | 61.9 | 56.3 |
| Average dew point °C (°F) | 21.1 (70.0) | 21.7 (71.1) | 22.1 (71.8) | 21.4 (70.5) | 19.5 (67.1) | 17.2 (63.0) | 15.8 (60.4) | 15.2 (59.4) | 15.6 (60.1) | 17.2 (63.0) | 19.0 (66.2) | 20.3 (68.5) | 18.8 (65.8) |
| Mean monthly sunshine hours | 201.8 | 175.1 | 214.3 | 231.0 | 263.2 | 274.3 | 297.5 | 318.6 | 306.6 | 292.6 | 231.2 | 217.3 | 3,023.5 |
Source: NOAA

== See also ==
- List of municipalities in Piauí
