= 2008–09 Coupe de France =

Tournament details
- Country: France
- Teams: 5,990

Final positions
- Champions: Guingamp
- Runners-up: Rennes

Tournament statistics
- Top goal scorer: Eduardo (7 goals)

The 2008–09 Coupe de France was the 92nd season of the French most prestigious cup competition and was open to all clubs in French football, as well as seven teams from overseas departments and territories (Guadeloupe, French Guiana, Martinique, Mayotte, New Caledonia, French Polynesia and Réunion). The final was held on 9 May 2009 at the Stade de France.

Guingamp claimed their first Coupe de France after defeating Rennes 2–1 after two second-half goals from Eduardo.

== Calendar ==
On 8 July 2008, French Football Federation (FFF) announced the calendar for the Coupe de France.

Date	Event
21 September 2008	Clubs in CFA 2 enter competition
5 October 2008	Clubs in CFA enter competition
19 October 2008	Clubs in the Championnat National enter competition
22–23 November 2008	Clubs in Ligue 2 enter competition
3–4 January 2009	Clubs in Ligue 1 enter competition
24–25 January 2009	Round of 32
3–4 March 2009	Round of 16
17–18 March 2009	Quarterfinals
21–22 April 2009	Semifinals
9 May 2009	Coupe de France Final

== Seventh Round ==
The draw for the seventh round of Coupe de France was conducted on 5 November 2008 in Lyon by former Lyon players Bernard Lacombe and Jean Djorkaeff, the latter who currently serves as the president of the Coupe de France Commission. The overseas region draw was conducted in Paris the same day, by Olympic medalists Pascal Gentil and Grégory Baugé. The matches were played on 21, 22 and 23 November 2008. The matches that were postponed were played on 30 November.

Tie no	Home team	Score	Away team
1	Bassin d'Arcachon	0–0; 3–2 p.	Aurillac
2	Luzenac	1–2	SC Bastia
3	Saint-Flour	1–3 aet	Montpellier
4	Blagnac	4–1	Saint-Alban
5	Villenave	1–2	Rilhac-Rancon
6	Genêts Anglet	0–1 aet	Bayonne
7	Rodez	1–0	Balma
8	Nouvelle	3–1	Cognac
9	Villefranche	1–1; 5–4 p.	Clermont Herault
10	Toulon	3–0	Saint-Maurice l'Exil
11	Bagnols Pont	2–2; 5–6 p.	AC Ajaccio
12	Andrézieux	2–0	Lyon-Duchère
13	Pennoise	0–2	Louhans-Cuiseaux
14	Grenoble-Villeneuve	0–2	Uzès Pont du Gard
15	Firminy	1–2	Nîmes
16	Bourg-Péronnas	1–1; 4–3 p.	Corte
17	Yzeure	5–1	Vichy
18	Albertville	0–0; 1–3 p.	Thiers
19	Saint-Clair-de-la-Tour	7–1	Montréal-la-Cluse
20	Cruseilles	0–4	Clermont Foot
21	Pont-de-Cheruy	0–1	Selongey
22	Saint-Priest	4–4; 3–4 p.	Troyes
23	Croix de Savoie	1–0	Montceau Bourgogne
24	Gazélec Ajaccio	3–1	Chenove
25	Le Poiré-sur-Vie	2–4	Tours
26	Poitiers	1–0	Thouaré
27	Châteauroux	2–1	Saumur
28	Orléans	0–1	Montluçon
29	Romorantin	1–0	Sablé
30	Les Herbiers	1–2	Niort
31	Carquefou	0–0; 3–4 p.	Vendée Luçon
32	Châtellerault	2–0	La Chapelle des Marais
33	Dinard	0–5	Guingamp
34	Lesneven	1–2	Plabennecois
35	La Vitréenne	3–0	TA Rennes
36	La Gacilly	3–4 aet	Saint-Brieuc
37	Goelands Larmor	1–0	Pontivy
38	Concarneau	2–0	Plouvorn
39	Lannion	0–0; 9–10 p.	Stade Brest
40	Vitré	2–1	Libourne-Saint-Seurin

Tie no	Home team	Score	Away team
41	Quimper	1–1; 4–2 p.	Saint-Malo
42	Arnage-Pontlieue	2–7	Angers
43	Mondeville	1–2	Alençon
44	Les Ulis	0–1	Sainte-Geneviève
45	Viry-Châtillon	2–1 aet	Saint-Lô
46	La Suze	0–2	Alfortville
47	Orly	4–1	Saint-Pryvé-Saint-Hilaire
48	Amilly	0–2	Changéenne
49	Vannes	3–1 aet	Cherbourg
50	Saint-Omer	1–0	Amiens SC
51	Ezanville-Ecouen	1–0	Marck
52	Le Touquet	1–2	Ararat Issy
53	AC Amiens	0–1	Pacy Vallée-d'Eure
54	Grande-Synthe	1–0	Saint Ouen L'Aumône
55	Creil	0–6	Quevilly
56	Évreux	0–2	Boulogne
57	Luneray	0–0; 1–3 p.	Beauvais Oise
58	RC Strasbourg	6–0	L'Entente
59	Mars Bischheim	2–4	Schirrhein
60	Lons-le-Saunier	0–3	Épinal
61	Raon-l'Étape	1–0	Saint-Dié
62	ASPV Strasbourg	1–4 aet	Besançon
63	Neuhof Strasbourg	1–0	Soleil Bischheim
64	Ornans	1–1; 4–5 p.	Pont-de-Roide
65	Haguenau	0–1	Dijon
66	Ligny-en-Barrois	3–0	Fameck
67	Eclaron-Valcourt	2–1	Dieue-Sommedieue
68	Sedan	1–0	Noisy-le-Sec
69	Chauny	2–0	Charleville
70	Créteil-Lusitanos	2–1	Metz
71	Amnéville	2–0	Saint-Dizier
72	Creutzwald	5–1	Bar-sur-Seine
73	Sarreguemine	0–3	Paris FC
74	Evry	2–1 aet	Wasquehal
75	Arras	0–0; 4–2 p.	Lens
76	Ribecourt	1–3	Marquette
77	Chantilly	0–1	Lesquin
78	Biache	0–2	Calais
79	Hénin-Beaumont	4–0	Roubaix Hommelet
80	Avion	6–0	Fresnoy-le-Grand
81	Villeneuve-Saint-Germain	1–9	Stade Reims

=== Overseas Region ===
Tie no	Home team	Score	Away team
1	Cayenne (Guy.)	0–1	Martigues
2	Foudre (May.)	1–3	Cannes
3	Rivière-Pilote (Mar.)	0–4	Vendée Fontenay
4	Mont-Dore (N.-C.)	2–4	Dunkerque

Tie no	Home team	Score	Away team
5	Colmar	1–1; 2–4 p.	Tefana (Pol.)
6	Saint Louis Neuweg	0–1	Jeanne d'Arc (Réu.)
7	Feignies	3–2	Evolucas (Gua.)

== Eighth Round ==
The draw for the eighth round was conducted on 25 November 2008 at the offices of the FFF in Paris. The drawers were current France under-17 coach Philippe Bergeroo and Stéphane Guivarc'h, member of the French squad that won the 1998 FIFA World Cup. The overseas region draw was conducted in Paris as well, by Bernard Diomède, who was also a member of the France squad that won the 1998 FIFA World Cup. The following matches were played on 12, 13 and 14 December 2008. The matches that were postponed were played on 20 December.

Tie no	Home team	Score	Away team
1	Pacy Vallée-d'Eure	0–1	Tours
2	Saint-Brieuc	0–1 aet	Concarneau
3	Guingamp	1–1; 4–1 p.	La Vitréenne
4	Orly	5–3	Plabennecois
5	Changéenne	2–4	Stade Brest
6	Goelands Larmor	0–5	Vitré
7	Quimper	0–0; 1–4 p.	Niort
8	Evry	2–1	Paris FC
9	Romorantin	1–1; 9–8 p.	Angers
10	Ararat Issy	0–5	Vannes
11	Viry-Châtillon	1–2	Créteil-Lusitanos
12	Eclaron-Valcourt	1–0	Châtellerault
13	Châteauroux	4–3	Chauny
14	Ezanville-Ecouen	1–3	Alençon
15	Grand-Synthe	1–0	Marquette
16	Avion	1–1; 4–5 p.	Saint-Omer
17	Dunkerque	2–1	Stade Reims
18	Boulogne	4–0	Lesquin
19	Troyes	3–1	Beauvais Oise
20	Hénin-Beaumont	0–0; 2–4 p.	Alfortville
21	Calais	2–1	Quevilly

Tie no	Home team	Score	Away team
22	Creutzwald	1–2	Schirrhein
23	Ligny-en-Barrois	1–4 aet	Raon-l'Étape
24	Neuhof Strasbourg	0–1	Louhans-Cuiseaux
25	Besançon	3–1	Amnéville
26	RC Strasbourg	2–4	Sedan
27	Selongey	3–6 aet	Dijon
28	Sainte-Geneviève	4–1	Épinal
29	Yzeure	2–0	Thiers
30	Blagnac	1–0	Rilhac-Rancon
31	AC Ajaccio	2–1	Vendée Fontenay
32	Montluçon	1–0	Vendée Luçon
33	Andrézieux	1–0	Poitiers
34	Rodez	3–0	Bassin d'Arcachon
35	Nîmes	0–1	Bayonne
36	Nouvelle	0–0; 4–2 p.	Toulon
37	Croix de Savoie	3–1 aet	Martigues
38	Bourg-Péronnas	2–2; 4–5 p.	Gazélec Ajaccio
39	Pont-de-Roide	2–1	SJS-Tour
40	Montpellier	0–0; 4–2 p.	Cannes
41	Villefranche	2–1	Uzès Pont du Gard
42	Clermont Foot	1–0	Bastia

=== Overseas Region ===
Tie no / Home team / Score / Away team; 1 / Tefana (Pol.) / 0–2 aet / Arras	Tie no / Home team / Score / Away team; 2 / Jeanne d'Arc (Réu.) / 3–2 / Feignies

== Round of 64 ==
The Round of 64 matches were played on 2, 3 and 4 January 2009. The draw was conducted on 15 December 2008 in Metz by former Nancy greats Olivier Rouyer and Bernard Zénier, former wheelchair fencing champion Yvon Pacault, and Anne Sophie Mathis, who is the current WBC Super-lightweight world champion. The matches that were postponed were played on 10 and 24 January 2009.

Tie no	Home team	Score	Away team
1	Nouvelle	0–3	Rodez
2	Romorantin	0–0; 4–2 p.	Nancy
3	Concarneau	0–6	Lyon
4	Blagnac	0–1	Monaco
5	Vannes	1–0	Châteauroux
6	Toulouse	0–0; 5–4 p.	Valenciennes
7	Bayonne	0–2	Vitré
8	Jeanne d'Arc (Réu.)	1–7	Tours
9	Stade Brest	2–2; 5–4 p.	Croix de Savoie
10	Sochaux	0–1	Rennes
11	Yzeure	0–0; 4–5 p.	Le Mans
12	AC Ajaccio	1–1; 3–1 p.	Auxerre
13	Andrézieux	0–2	Sedan
14	Montluçon	0–1	PSG
15	Evry	0–5	Créteil-Lusitanos
16	Villefranche	2–1	Orly
17	Niort	1–2 aet	Boulogne

Tie no	Home team	Score	Away team
18	Alfortville	0–2	Le Havre
19	Arras	1–3 aet	Nice
20	Montpellier	0–1	Dunkerque
21	Saint-Omer	1–3	Guingamp
22	Alençon	2–2; 2–3 p.	Lorient
23	Bordeaux	0–1	Saint-Étienne
24	Grand-Synthe	1–1; 4–2 p.	Calais
25	Raon-l'Étape	0–0; 3–4 p.	Grenoble Foot
26	Louhans-Cuiseaux	0–1 aet	Troyes
27	Nantes	2–2; 3–5 p.	Caen
28	Pont-de-Roide	0–1	Gazélec Ajaccio
29	Schirrhein	4–2	Clermont Foot
30	Besançon	1–1; 4–5 p.	Marseille
31	Eclaron-Valcourt	0–5	Dijon
32	Sainte-Geneviève	0–3	Lille

== Round of 32 ==
The Round of 32 matches were played on 23, 24, 25 and 28 January. The draw was conducted on 4 January in Issy-les-Moulineaux, Paris, at the headquarters of Eurosport by Chloé Mortaud, the recently crowned Miss France and 2008 Summer Olympics bronze medalist Teddy Riner. The Guingamp – Brest match was rescheduled to 20 January.

Tie no	Home team	Score	Away team
1	Lyon	1–0	Marseille
2	Troyes	1–2	Rodez
3	Dijon	4–1	Villefranche
4	Dunkerque	0–3	Lille
5	AC Ajaccio	2–0	Vannes
6	Monaco	1–0	Nice
7	Lorient	2–1 aet	Tours
8	Rennes	2–0	Saint-Étienne
9	Le Havre	0–1 aet	Le Mans

Tie no	Home team	Score	Away team
10	Boulogne	3–1	Caen
11	Gazélec Ajaccio	0–3	PSG
12	Guingamp	2–0 aet	Stade Brest
13	Grand-Synthe	1–3	Grenoble Foot
14	Vitré	1–1; 9–8 p.	Créteil-Lusitanos
15	Romorantin	0–0; 5–6 p.	Sedan
16	Schirrhein	0–8	Toulouse

== Round of 16 ==
The Round of 16 matches were played on 3 and 4 March. The draw was conducted on 25 January 2009 in Issy-les-Moulineaux, Paris at the headquarters of Eurosport by French journalist and television host Michel Drucker and former player and manager Michel Hidalgo.

Tie no	Home team	Score	Away team
1	Sedan (2)	3–1	Vitré (4)
2	Dijon (2)	1–1; 2–4 p.	Grenoble Foot (1)
3	Guingamp (2)	1–0	Le Mans (1)
4	AC Ajaccio (2)	0–2	Monaco (1)

Tie no	Home team	Score	Away team
5	Lille (1)	3–2	Lyon (1)
6	Rodez (3)	3–1 aet	PSG (1)
7	Rennes (1)	3–0	Lorient (1)
8	Boulogne (2)	0–2	Toulouse (1)

== Quarter-finals ==
The quarterfinal matches were played on 17 and 18 March. The draw was conducted on 8 March 2009 in Versailles, Paris at the Galaxy Foot Salon by French female volleyball player Victoria Rava and French female sprinter Muriel Hurtis.

17 March 2009	Sedan (2)	1–3	Guingamp (2)	Sedan
18:00 CET	Allart 18'	Report	Eduardo 38', 74'; Oruma 62'	Stadium: Stade Louis Dugauguez; Attendance: 8,598; Referee: Philippe Kalt

17 March 2009	Toulouse (1)	1–1 (a.e.t.) (7–6 p)	Lille (1)	Toulouse
20:45 CET	Emerson 110' (o.g.)	Report	Bastos 105'	Stadium: Stadium Municipal; Attendance: 18,303; Referee: Tony Chapron
	Penalties
	Ebondo (penalty scored); Pentecôte (penalty scored); Gignac (penalty scored); Bergougnoux (penalty missed); Cetto (penalty scored); Braaten (penalty scored); Fofana (penalty scored); Sissoko (penalty scored)		(penalty scored) Bastos; (penalty scored) Mavuba; (penalty missed) Rami; (penalty scored) Balmont; (penalty scored) Hazard; (penalty scored) Chedjou; (penalty scored) Vandam; (penalty missed) Emerson

18 March 2009	Grenoble Foot (1)	2–0	Monaco (1)	Grenoble
17:00 CET	Moreira 13'; Akrour 54'	Report		Stadium: Stade des Alpes; Attendance: 14,065; Referee: Thierry Auriac

18 March 2009	Rennes (1)	2–0	Rodez (3)	Rennes
19:00 CET	Mbia 32'; Briand 61'	Report		Stadium: Route de Lorient; Attendance: 18,964; Referee: Olivier Thual

== Semi-finals ==
The semifinal matches were played on 21 and 22 April. The draw was conducted on 22 March 2009 by current France international Samir Nasri.

21 April 2009	Grenoble Foot (1)	0–1	Rennes (1)	Grenoble
20:45 CET		Report	Sow 22'	Stadium: Stade des Alpes; Attendance: 17,822; Referee: Hervé Piccirillo

22 April 2009	Toulouse (1)	1–2	Guingamp (2)	Toulouse
20:45 CET	Gignac 75'	Report	Eduardo 29'; Sène 90'	Stadium: Stadium Municipal; Attendance: 30,755; Referee: Eric Poulat

== Final ==
9 May 2009
20:45 CET

Rennes	1–2	Guingamp
Bocanegra 69'	Report	Eduardo 72', 82'

Stade de France, Saint-Denis
Attendance: 80,056
Referee: Thierry Auriac

== Topscorer ==
Eduardo (7 goals)

== Miscellaneous ==
RC Saint-André were awarded the "Petit Poucet" Plaque for achieving the best performance in the Coupe de France by an amateur club. Saint-André, who play Championnat de District Level 3 managed to reach the 6th round by eliminating Promotion Ligue side Etoile Chapelaine in the 1st Round, three d'Honneur Régionale sides (FC Nogentais, Chaumont PTT, FCO St. Julien) in the 2nd Round, 3rd Round, and 4th Round, respectively. They defeated another Promotion Ligue side in Bagneux Clesles, before suffering elimination to Foyer Barsequanais in the 6th Round. Their exploits allowed the club to accumulate 30 points and thus defeat FCE Schirrhein (29 points), who were eliminated by Ligue 1 club Toulouse after making it all the way to the Round of 32.

== Media coverage ==
In France, France Télévisions were the free to air broadcasters while Eurosport were the subscription broadcasters.

These matches were broadcast live on French television:

Round	France Télévisions	Eurosport
Seventh Round		
Eighth Round		
Round of 64		
Round of 32		
Round of 16		
Quarter-finals		
Semi-finals		
Final		
