= En Avant Guingamp =

French football club

Guingamp
- Full name: En Avant Guingamp
- Nicknames: Les Guingampais; Les Costarmoricains (The Costamoricans); Les Rouge et Noir (The Red and Blacks); L'En-Avant
- Short name: EAG
- Founded: 1912; 114 years ago
- Ground: Stade de Roudourou
- Capacity: 19,033
- President: Frédéric Legrand
- Head coach: Sylvain Ripoll
- League: Ligue 2
- 2025–26: Ligue 2, 11th of 18
- Website: eaguingamp.com
| Home colours | Away colours | Third colours |

En Avant Guingamp (Breton: War-raok Gwengamp, English: Forward Guingamp), commonly referred to as EA Guingamp, EAG, or simply Guingamp (French: [ɡɛ̃ɡɑ̃]), is a French professional football club based in the commune of Guingamp, in France's Brittany region. The club was founded in 1912 and play in Ligue 2, the second tier of French football. The club has appeared in the Ligue 1, the top flight of French football, for 13 seasons, and is known for its relative success given Guingamp's small population of only 7,000 people.

Guingamp are one of only two clubs who have won the Coupe de France while not being in the first division, doing so in 2009, by defeating Rennes, 2–1. They won the same competition again in 2014, this time in the top flight, with a victory against Rennes, 2–0.

== History ==
Having been an amateur club for a long time, playing in the regional leagues, the club got promoted three times under the presidency of Noël Le Graët, who took over in 1972. In 1976, Guingamp reached the Third Division (now called Championnat National), and the next season they were promoted to the Second Division (now called Ligue 2), where they stayed until 1993. The club became fully professional in 1984, and in 1990 the Stade de Roudourou was opened, with Guingamp hosting Paris Saint-Germain in the inaugural match.

The club's first major honour was winning the Coupe de France in 2009, the second team in history not from Ligue 1 to win the competition. The team defeated Breton rivals Rennes 2–1 in the final. Also, in 2014, En Avant de Guingamp beat Stade Rennais F.C. 2–0 at the Stade de France. Aside from two years of Coupe de France triumph, the club's only other major feat was winning the 1996 UEFA Intertoto Cup.

The club has played in the French top flight before, having gained promotion only three times: 1995, 2000 and 2013. Their longest stay in the top flight was between 2013 and 2019. Following the 2012–13 season, the club was relegated back to Ligue 2 at the conclusion of the 2018–19 season finishing in 20th place.

Aside from winning the Coupe de France, Guingamp is known for having served as a springboard for prominent players that include Didier Drogba, Florent Malouda, Fabrice Abriel, and Vincent Candela. Managers such as Guy Lacombe, Francis Smerecki, and Erick Mombaerts also used the club as springboards during the infancy of their coaching careers. Guingamp is presided over by Bertrand Desplat. The former president, Noël Le Graët, is president of the French Football Federation. The club has a women's team who play in the Division 1 Féminine, and a reserve team in the CFA2.

In the 2018–19 season, Guingamp reached the Coupe de la ligue final against RC Strasbourg. Guingamp lost the final losing 4–1 on penalties after the match ended goalless during 120 minutes of play.

On 12 May 2019, Guingamp were relegated to Ligue 2 ending a six-year stay in the top division after drawing 1–1 with rivals Stade Rennais F.C.

=== Timeline ===
- 1912: Foundation of the club.
- 1922: First match at Stade de Montbareil.
- 1929: First promotion to the Division d'Honneur.
- 1949: Second promotion to the Division d'Honneur.
- 1974: Third promotion to the Division d'Honneur.
- 1976: First promotion to Division 3.
- 1977: First promotion to Division 2.
- 1984: Adoption of professional status.
- 1990: First match at Stade de Roudourou.
- 1994: Second promotion to Ligue 2.
- 1995: First promotion to Ligue 1.
- 1996: Winner of the Intertoto Cup and first appearance in Europe.
- 1997: Runner-up of the Coupe de France.
- 2000: Second promotion to Ligue 1.
- 2004: Relegation from Ligue 1.
- 2009: Winner of the Coupe de France and second appearance in Europe.
- 2010: Relegation from Ligue 2.
- 2011: Promotion to Ligue 2.
- 2013: Promotion to Ligue 1.
- 2014: Winner of the Coupe de France and third appearance in the UEFA Europa League.
- 2019: Finished runner up in the Coupe de la ligue final.
- 2019: Relegated to Ligue 2.

== Stadium ==
Guingamp plays its home matches at the Stade de Roudourou in the city. It is unusual for a commune of 7,280 inhabitants to have a professional football club, let alone one that plays in the first tier. Also the stadium has a capacity of 18,000 spectators, roughly 2.5 times the commune's population.

== Players ==
=== Current squad ===
==== First team ====
As of 7 September 2026

Note: Flags indicate national team as defined under FIFA eligibility rules; some limited exceptions apply. Players may hold more than one non-FIFA nationality.

| No. | Pos. | Nation | Player |
|---|---|---|---|
| 1 | GK | GLP | Teddy Bartouche |
| 2 | DF | FRA | Erwin Koffi |
| 3 | DF | FRA | Jérémie Matumona |
| 4 | MF | FRA | Dylan Louiserre (captain) |
| 5 | DF | FIN | Tuomas Ollila |
| 6 | MF | FRA | Darly Nlandu |
| 7 | DF | SEN | Donatien Gomis |
| 8 | MF | FRA | Florent Sanchez Da Silva |
| 10 | MF | FRA | Amine Hemia |
| 11 | FW | GAB | Teddy Averlant |
| 16 | GK | ESP | Adrián Ortolá |
| 17 | FW | FRA | Amadou Samoura |
| 18 | FW | FRA | Stanislas Kielt |

| No. | Pos. | Nation | Player |
|---|---|---|---|
| 20 | MF | FRA | Samir Ben Brahim |
| 21 | MF | FRA | Tanguy Ahile |
| 22 | FW | COD | Brandon Bokangu |
| 23 | MF | FRA | Jasser Chamakh |
| 24 | DF | BEL | Jeovanni Dianganga |
| 25 | MF | FRA | Tom Ducrocq |
| 30 | FW | FRA | Gautier Ott |
| 31 | MF | FRA | Joël Matondo |
| 32 | DF | FRA | Ibrahima Diakité |
| 35 | DF | FRA | Nathan Fondja |
| 36 | DF | FRA | Albin Demouchy |
| 39 | DF | FRA | Vimoj Muntu Wa Mungu |
| 40 | GK | FRA | Noah Marec |

=== Out on loan ===
Note: Flags indicate national team as defined under FIFA eligibility rules; some limited exceptions apply. Players may hold more than one non-FIFA nationality.

| No. | Pos. | Nation | Player |
|---|---|---|---|
| — | DF | MLI | Eden Gassama (at La Roche-sur-Yon until 30 June 2027) |

=== Notable players ===
Below are the notable former players who have represented Guingamp in league and international competition since the club's foundation in 1912. To appear in the section below, a player must have played in at least 80 official matches for the club.

For a complete list of Guingamp players, see Category:En Avant Guingamp players

- Ghislain Anselmini
- Yannick Baret
- Christian Bassila
- Jimmy Briand
- Stéphane Carnot
- Fabrice Colleau
- Charles-Édouard Coridon
- Moumouni Dagano
- Thierry Debès
- Sylvain Deplace
- Yves Deroff
- Mustapha Diallo
- Didier Drogba
- Felipe
- Romain Ferrier
- Fabrice Fiorèse
- Jérôme Foulon
- Hubert Fournier
- Thibault Giresse
- Auriol Guillaume
- Stéphane Guivarc'h
- Laurent Guyot
- Laurent Hervé
- Angelo Hugues
- Yann Jouffre
- Marek Jóźwiak
- Raymond Keruzoré
- Anthony Knockaert
- Bakary Koné
- Laurent Koscielny
- Blaise Kouassi
- Nicolas Laspalles
- Ronan Le Crom
- Arnaud Le Lan
- Christophe Le Roux
- Richard Lecomte
- Florent Malouda
- Lionel Mathis
- Claude Michel
- Gheorghe Mihali
- Mouritala Ogunbiyi
- Yohann Rivière
- Bertrand Robert
- Lionel Rouxel
- Yvon Schmitt
- Harlington Shereni
- Milovan Sikimić
- Richard Soumah
- Guy Stéphan
- Andrzej Szarmach
- Abdelhafid Tasfaout
- Stéphane Trévisan

== European record ==
| Season | Competition | Round | Club | 1st leg | 2nd leg | Aggregate |
|---|---|---|---|---|---|---|
| 1996 | UEFA Intertoto Cup | Group 12 | (Federal Republic of Yugoslavia) FK Zemun | 1–0 | | 1st |
| 1996 | UEFA Intertoto Cup | Group 12 | (Finland) FF Jaro | 0–0 | | 1st |
| 1996 | UEFA Intertoto Cup | Group 12 | (Romania) Dinamo Bucharest | 2–1 | | 1st |
| 1996 | UEFA Intertoto Cup | Group 12 | (Georgia (country)) Kolkheti Poti | 3–1 | | 1st |
| 1996 | UEFA Intertoto Cup | SF | (Russia) KAMAZ | 0–2 | 4–0(aet) | 4–2 |
| 1996 | UEFA Intertoto Cup | Finals | (Russia) Rotor Volgograd | 1–2 | 1–0 | 2–2^{1} |
| 1996–97 | UEFA Cup | 1R | (Italy) Internazionale | 0–3 | 1–1 | 1–4 |
| 2003 | UEFA Intertoto Cup | 3R | (Czech Republic) 1. FC Brno | 2–1 | 2–4(aet) | 4–5 |
| 2009–10 | UEFA Europa League | PO | (Germany) Hamburg | 1–5 | 1–3 | 2–8 |
| 2014–15 | UEFA Europa League | Group K | (Italy) Fiorentina | 0–3 | 1–2 | 2nd |
| 2014–15 | UEFA Europa League | Group K | (Greece) PAOK | 2–0 | 2–1 | 2nd |
| 2014–15 | UEFA Europa League | Group K | (Belarus) Dinamo Minsk | 0–0 | 2–0 | 2nd |
| 2014–15 | UEFA Europa League | R32 | (Ukraine) Dynamo Kyiv | 2–1 | 1–3 | 3–4 |

Notes

^{1} Guingamp won the Final on away goals.

- 1R: First round
- 3R: Third round
- PO: Play-off round
- SF: Semi-finals

== Ownership ==
=== Club hierarchy ===
As of 24 September 2019

| Position | Name |
|---|---|
| President | Bertrand Desplat |
| Vice-President | Frédéric Legrand |
| Association President | Jean-Paul Briand |
| Head coach | Stéphane Dumont |
| Assistant head coach | Benjamin Genton |
| Goalkeeper coach | Anthony Corre |
| Fitness coach | Benjamin LeBrun |
| Video analyst | Lucas Massello-Heuzé |
| Doctor | Miguel Rosinet |
| Physiotherapist | Quentin Beauvallet; Charly Pradeau |
| Intendant | Arnaud Le Briand |

=== Managerial history ===
- Jean Prouff (1955–56)
- Claude Pérard (1977–78)
- René Cédolin (1978–81)
- Raymond Kéruzoré (1981–86)
- Jean-Noël Huck (1986)
- Yvan Le Quéré (1987–88)
- Jean-Paul Rabier (1988–89)
- Erick Mombaerts (1989–90)
- Alain De Martigny (1990–93)
- Yvon Schmitt (1993)
- Francis Smerecki (1 July 1993 – 15 February 1999)
- Guy Lacombe (3 February 1999 – 30 June 2002)
- Bertrand Marchand (1 July 2002 – 30 June 2004)
- Yvon Pouliquen (1 July 2004 – 19 September 2005)
- Alain Ravera (25 September 2005 – 15 May 2006)
- Patrick Rémy (20 May 2006 – 3 October 2007)
- Victor Zvunka (3 October 2007 – 28 May 2010)
- Jocelyn Gourvennec (1 July 2010 – 27 May 2016)
- Antoine Kombouaré (30 May 2016 – 6 November 2018)
- Jocelyn Gourvennec (8 November 2018 – 24 May 2019)
- Patrice Lair (29 May 2019 – 23 September 2019)
- Sylvain Didot (24 September 2019 – 30 August 2020)
- Mehmed Baždarević (30 August 2020 – 1 February 2021)
- Frédéric Bompard (1 February 2021 – 25 May 2021)
- Stéphane Dumont (27 May 2021 – 2024)
- Sylvain Ripoll (2024–Present)

== Honours ==
=== Domestic ===
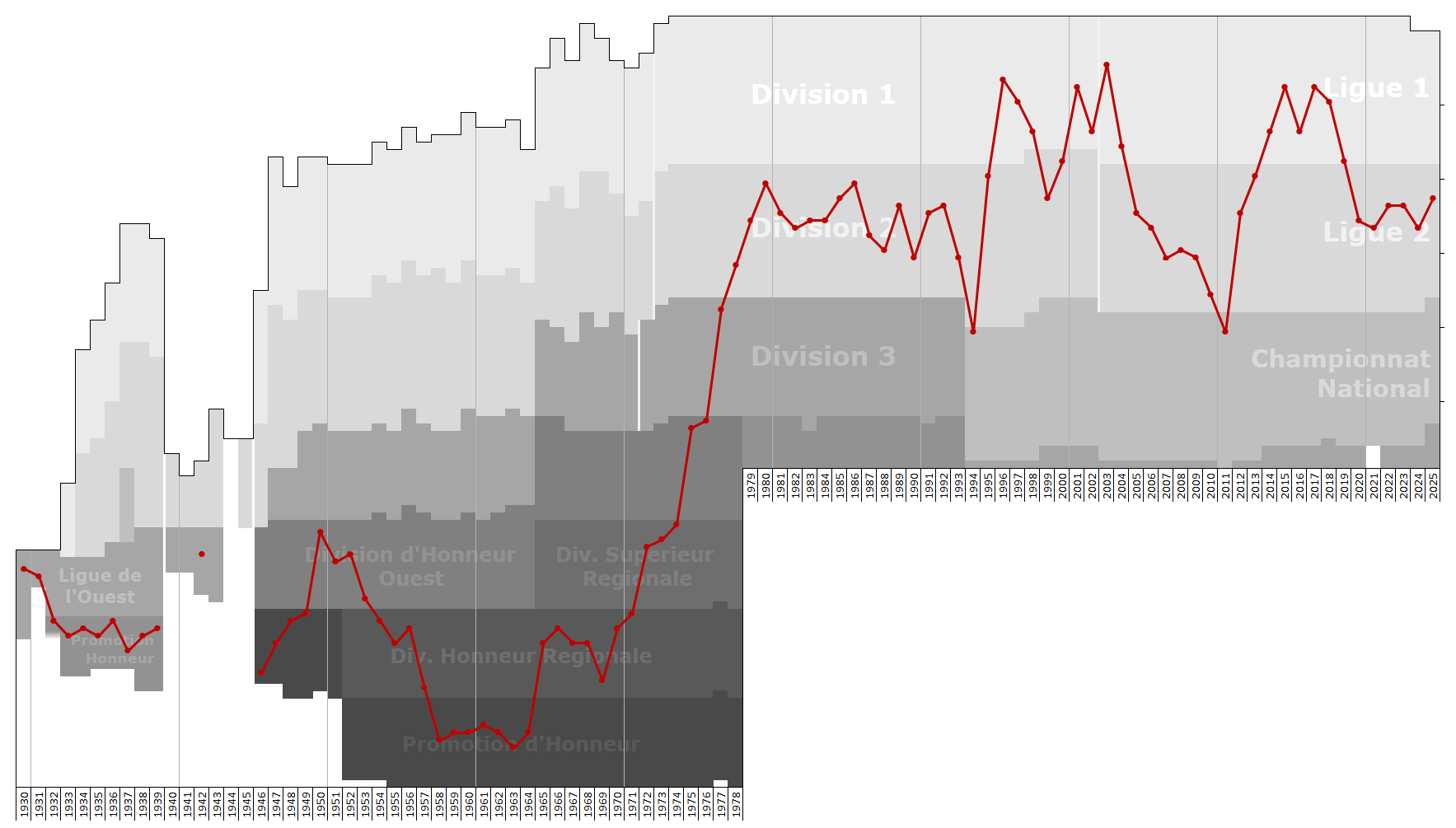
Historical league performance chart of EA Guingamp

- Coupe de France
  - Winners (2): 2008–09, 2013–14
  - Runners-up (1): 1996–97
- Coupe de la Ligue
  - Runners-up (1): 2018–19
- Trophée des Champions
  - Runners-up (2): 2009, 2014
- Ligue 2
  - Runners-up (3): 1994–95, 1999–2000, 2012–13
- Championnat National
  - Winners (1): 1993–94
- Coupe de Bretagne
  - Winners (2): 1975, 1979
  - Runners-up (2): 1947, 1952
- Championnat de l'Ouest
  - Winners (2): 1976, 1984

=== Europe ===
- Intertoto Cup
  - Winners (1): 1996
