= 2009–10 Championnat de France Amateur =

Championnat de France amateur
- Season: 2009–10
- Champions: Colmar (Groupe A)
- Promoted: Gap (Groupe B); Niort (Groupe C); Orléans (Groupe D)
- Relegated: Bordeaux B Balma; Dunkerque; Grenoble B Le Pontet; Mantes; Marck; Montpellier B Pontivy; Quimper; Strasbourg B Toulouse Fontaines; Vesoul
- Top goalscorer: Frédéric Marques (22)

The 2009–10 Championnat de France Amateurs season was the 12th edition of the competition since its establishment. The competition officially began on 8 August 2009 and ended in May 2010. The competition consisted of 73 clubs spread into four parallel groups of 18 with one of the groups containing 19 clubs. It is open to reserve teams in France and amateur clubs in France, although only the amateur clubs are eligible for promotion to the Championnat National. The highest-placed amateur team in each pool are promoted, replaced by the four lowest-placed in the Championnat.

== DNGC Rulings ==
All clubs that secured CFA status for the 2009–10 season were subject to approval by the DNCG before becoming eligible to participate.

Following the DNCG's annual report on clubs, on 25 June, it was announced that six clubs had been relegated from the National to lower divisions. AS Beauvais, SO Cassis Carnoux, CS Louhans-Cuiseaux, and FC Libourne Saint-Seurin were relegated to the Championnat de France Amateurs. Besançon RC, US Luzenac, and FC Rouen, who were all recently promoted, were relegated to Championnat de France Amateurs 2, while FC Sète and Calais RUFC were relegated to the Division d'Honneur. All clubs relegated were allowed to appeal the decision.

Following an appeal from the aforementioned clubs, FC Rouen, AS Beauvais, and US Luzenac had their appeals successfully overturned meaning they will remain in the Championnat National. Some clubs were, however, unsuccessful. FC Sète's appeal was upheld relegating them to the Division d'Honneur. Stade Plabennecois will replace them in the Championnat National. FC Libourne Saint-Seurin, Besançon RC, and Calais RUFC appeals were also rejected by the DNCG, however, all three clubs decided to take their case to the CNOSF, the National Sporting Committee of France which governs sport in France. Both Calais and Besançon's rulings were determined on 23 July. The CNOSF determined that Besançon should be relegated to the CFA and not CFA 2, while Calais should respect and oblige the DNCG's ruling relegated them to CFA 2.

Libourne's ruling was determined on 27 July, when the CNOSF informed the club that they should honor the DNCG's ruling and suffer relegation to the CFA. Libourne's chairman Bernard Layda responded by announcing the club will file for bankruptcy, restructure themselves, and oblige the ruling. Besançon and Libourne are slated to be replaced by ES Fréjus and AS Moulins.

Both CS Louhans-Cuiseaux and SO Cassis Carnoux had their appeals heard by the DNCG on 9 July. On 10 July, the DNGC ruled that both Louhans-Cuiseaux and Cassis-Carnoux rulings had been overturned meaning they will play in the Championnat National this season.

On 29 July, the French Football Federation unanimously suspended newly promoted CFA club Toulouse Rodéo FC from the league following abnormalities detected in the club's use of non-licensed players. The club was replaced by Red Star Saint-Ouen, who were relegated from the CFA last year.

On 6 August, just three days before the start of the season, the CNSOF ruled that CFA 2 club Olympique Saumur would be allowed promotion to the CFA on the assumption that the club was ranked second behind Les Herbiers VF in terms of the promotion chart following a current CFA club's relegation by means of a federation ruling. With Besançon's relegation to the CFA, it has been determined that two groups would have an allocation of 20 clubs, while one group would have an allocation of 19 clubs. Due to the sudden circumstances, on 7 August, the FFF devised a brand new schedule for the CFA. The federation also announced that they had rejected the CNOSF's proposal for integrating Saumur into the CFA. Saumur responding by announcing their intent to appeal the judgment in Administrative Court.

== Promotion and relegation from 2008–09 ==
Promoted from CFA 2

- Champions, Groupe A: Marck
- Champions, Groupe B: Drancy
- Champions, Groupe C: Épinal
- Champions, Groupe D: Grenoble B
- 2nd Place, Groupe E: Le Pontet^{1}
- Champions, Groupe F: Toulouse Fontaines
- 2nd Place, Groupe G: Les Herbiers^{2}
- Champions, Groupe H: Carquefou
- 2nd Place, Groupe B : Ivry-sur-Seine
- 2nd Place, Groupe C : Amneville
- 2nd Place, Groupe D : Bourg-Peronnas
- 2nd Place, Groupe H : Avranches

^{1}Saint-Raphael finished Champions, but cannot participate in next season's CFA because the club will fuse with ES Fréjus to form a new club. As such, Le Pontet was allowed to take their promotion spot.

^{2}Tours B finished Champions, but cannot participate in CFA because the DNCG deemed the formation structure of the reserve inadequate. Les Herbiers were allowed to take their promotion spot.

Teams relegated from Championnat National 2009–10

- 17th Place: Niort
- 18th Place: Calais
- 19th Place: Cherbourg
- 20th Place: L'Entente

Teams promoted to Championnat National 2009–10

- Champions, Groupe A: Besançon
- Champions, Groupe B: Hyères
- Champions, Groupe C: Luzenac
- Champions, Groupe D: Rouen

Relegated from CFA to CFA 2

- 16th Place, Groupe A: Vesoul
- 17th Place, Groupe A: Metz B
- 18th Place, Groupe A: Sainte-Geneviève
- 16th Place, Groupe B: Saint-Étienne B
- 17th Place, Groupe B: Saint-Priest
- 18th Place, Groupe B: AS Monaco B
- 16th Place, Groupe C: Châtellerault
- 17th Place, Groupe C: Bordelais
- 18th Place, Groupe C: Bergerac
- 16th Place, Groupe D: Red Star
- 17th Place, Groupe D: Guingamp B
- 18th Place, Groupe D: Vitré

== League Tables ==
Last updated: 30 May 2010

=== Groupe A ===
Pos	Team	P	W	D	L	GF	GA	GD	Pts	
1	Colmar (C) (P)	36	19	12	5	55	33	+22	105	Promotion to Championnat National
2	Alfortville (P)	36	19	10	7	56	37	+19	103	Promotion to Championnat National
3	Villemomble	36	15	16	5	45	33	+12	97	
4	Besançon	36	15	11	10	59	48	+11	92	
5	Amnéville	36	15	8	13	58	55	+3	89	
6	Drancy	36	15	7	14	49	51	−2	88	
7	Noisy-le-Sec	36	11	17	8	52	46	+6	86	
8	Épinal	36	13	11	12	45	46	−1	86	
9	Nancy Reserves	36	14	8	14	47	46	+1	86	Championnat de France amateur Playoffs
10	Lille Reserves	36	11	16	9	55	47	+8	84	
11	Compiègne	36	11	15	10	42	40	+2	84	
12	Raon-l'Étape	36	11	12	13	47	48	−1	81	
13	Mulhouse	36	12	9	15	41	48	−7	81	
14	Sannois Saint-Gratien	36	12	9	15	47	51	−4	81	
15	Lens Reserves	36	12	8	16	40	42	−2	80	
16	Vesoul (R)	36	9	11	16	29	45	−16	74	Relegation to Championnat de France amateur 2
17	Dunkerque (R)	36	10	7	19	45	53	−8	73	Relegation to Championnat de France amateur 2
18	Marck (R)	36	8	13	15	43	57	−14	73	Relegation to Championnat de France amateur 2
19	Strasbourg Reserves (R)	36	4	12	20	28	59	−31	60	Relegation to Championnat de France amateur 2

=== Groupe B ===
Pos	Team	P	W	D	L	GF	GA	GD	Pts	
1	Gap (P)	34	17	9	8	58	34	+24	94	Promotion to Championnat National
2	Gazélec Ajaccio	34	16	10	8	45	30	+15	92	
3	Jura Sud	34	16	9	9	47	37	+10	91	
4	Lyon Reserves	34	12	15	7	51	38	+13	85	Championnat de France amateur Playoffs
5	Martigues	34	13	10	11	39	35	+4	83	
6	Marignane	33	13	10	10	34	34	0	82	
7	Toulon	33	13	11	9	38	31	+7	80	
8	Agde	34	11	13	10	30	39	−9	80	
9	CA Bastia	34	11	11	12	40	38	+2	78	
10	Bourg-Péronnas	34	11	11	12	37	47	−10	78	
11	Sochaux Reserves	34	11	9	14	37	33	+4	76	
12	Montceau Bourgogne^{1}	34	12	9	13	42	42	0	76	
13	Villefranche	34	12	9	13	41	45	−4	76	
14	Andrézieux	34	11	8	15	36	39	−3	75	
15	Lyon-Duchère	34	10	11	13	30	34	−4	75	
16	Le Pontet (R)	34	10	11	13	40	54	−14	75	Relegation to Championnat de France amateur 2
17	Montpellier Reserves (R)	34	8	12	14	35	41	−6	70	Relegation to Championnat de France amateur 2
18	Grenoble Reserves (R)	34	6	10	18	31	55	−24	62	Relegation to Championnat de France amateur 2

^{1} Montceau Bourgogne have been docked 3 points.

=== Groupe C ===
Pos	Team	P	W	D	L	GF	GA	GD	Pts	
1	Niort (P)	34	18	11	5	53	23	+30	99	Promoted to Championnat National
2	Yzeure	34	16	10	8	37	28	+9	92	
3	Vendée Luçon	34	15	11	8	45	39	+6	90	
4	Paris SG Reserves	34	13	15	6	37	28	+9	88	Championnat de France amateur Playoffs
5	Albi	34	14	12	8	42	40	+2	88	
6	Montluçon	34	14	10	10	45	36	+9	86	
7	Colomiers	34	13	9	12	33	29	+4	82	
8	Les Herbiers	34	12	12	10	48	44	+4	82	
9	Le Mans Reserves	34	10	14	10	42	34	+8	78	
10	Libourne-Saint-Seurin	34	10	14	10	35	31	+5	78	
11	Red Star	34	11	9	14	38	42	−4	76	
12	Pau	34	9	12	13	30	35	−5	73	
13	Aurillac	34	8	14	12	26	40	−14	72	
14	Genêts d'Anglet	34	9	9	16	29	42	−13	70	
15	Vendée Fontenay	34	6	18	10	31	41	−10	70	
16	Bordeaux Reserves^{2} (R)	34	9	10	15	23	32	−9	69	Relegation to Championnat de France amateur 2
17	Balma (R)	34	6	12	16	27	41	−14	64	Relegation to Championnat de France amateur 2
18	Toulouse Fontaines (R)	34	6	10	18	25	39	−14	62	Relegation to Championnat de France amateur 2

^{2} Bordeaux Reserves have been docked 5 points.

=== Groupe D ===
Pos	Team	P	W	D	L	GF	GA	GD	Pts	
1	Orléans (P)	34	19	12	3	43	21	+22	103	Promotion to Championnat National
2	Vitréenne	34	17	10	7	49	34	+15	95	
3	Le Havre Reserves	34	15	14	5	59	40	+19	93	Championnat de France amateur Playoffs
4	Cherbourg	34	17	8	9	45	33	+12	93	
5	Quevilly	34	13	9	12	52	46	+6	82	
6	Racing^{3}	34	13	11	10	47	36	+11	81	
7	Romorantin	34	12	11	11	59	57	+2	81	
8	Viry-Châtillon	34	13	8	13	50	58	−8	81	
9	Ivry	34	12	10	12	40	37	+3	80	
10	Auxerre Reserves	34	12	9	13	47	42	+5	79	
11	Sénart-Moissy	34	11	12	11	49	47	+2	79	
12	Carquefou	34	12	9	13	37	42	−5	79	
13	Rennes Reserves	34	12	9	13	31	41	−10	76	
14	Caen Reserves	34	9	12	13	46	43	+3	73	
15	Avranches	34	10	9	15	34	44	−10	73	
16	Mantes (R)	34	10	7	17	35	49	−14	71	Relegation to Championnat de France amateur 2
17	Quimper (R)	34	6	9	19	24	57	−33	61	Relegation to Championnat de France amateur 2
18	Pontivy (R)	34	5	10	19	36	57	−21	59	Relegation to Championnat de France amateur 2

^{3} Racing have been docked 3 points due to financial irregularities.

== Playoffs ==
The Championnat de France Amateurs playoffs are designated for only the professional clubs B teams playing in the league. The best finishing professional reserve club in each group will advance to the playoffs where they will face each other at a site to be determined. The semi-final opponents are determined by the best finishing place. The best finishing reserve club will be awarded the 1st seed, while the worst finishing reserve club of the four will be awarded the 4th seed.

Semifinals
1	Le Havre	3
4	Nancy	2
2	Paris SG	0
3	Lyon	3

Finals
1	Le Havre	2
3	Lyon	3

=== Semi-finals ===
1 June
15:00 CET

Paris SG	0–3	Lyon
	Report	Lacazette 60', 63'; Miguet 70'

Stade Georges Lefèvre, Paris
Referee: Ansel Aymeric (Ligue Nord-Pas-de-Calais)

1 June
17:00 CET

Le Havre	3–2	Nancy
Quedeville 16' (o.g.); Fardou 42'; Laguarrigue 78'	Report	Makota 71'; Hadji 87'

Stade de la Cavee, Le Havre
Referee: Eric Wernert (Ligue de Paris-Île-de-France)

=== Final ===
4 June
16:00 CET

Le Havre	2–3	Lyon
Fardou 85'; Kifoueti 107'	Report	Court 63', 98'; Novillo 95'

Stade de Gerland, Lyon
Referee: Fabrice Baussay (Ligue du Maine)

== Top goalscorers ==
Last updated: 17 April 2010

=== Groupe A ===
Rank	Scorer	Club	Goals
1	(France) Frédéric Marques	Amnéville	18
2	(France) Abdel Moukhlil	Colmar	16
2	(France) Julien Perrin	Besançon	16
4	(France) Mouhamadou Kébé	Sannois Saint-Gratien	13
5	(France) Cédric Moukouri	Drancy	11
6	(France) Hassan Benkajjane	Mulhouse	10
6	(Algeria) Khaled Kemas	Alfortville	10
8	(Morocco) Aatif Chahéchouhe	Nancy B	9
8	(France) Nouredine Haderbache	Noisy-le-Sec	9
8	(France) Frédéric Hébert	Villemomble	9

=== Groupe B ===
Rank	Scorer	Club	Goals
1	(Algeria) Lamine Djaballah	Gap	13
2	(France) Samir Benmeziane	Le Pontet	11
2	(France) Alexandre Lacazette	Lyon B	11
4	(France) Grégory Firquet	Gap	10
5	(France) Christophe Chapdaniel	Lyon Duchère	9
5	(France) Madimoussa Traoré	Gazélec	9
7	(Cape Verde) Bruno Barreto	Villefranche	8
7	(France) Lionel Beineix	Bourg-Péronnas	8
7	(France) Sloan Privat	Sochaux B	8
10	(France) Abdelilah Aabiza	Agde	7

=== Groupe C ===
Rank	Scorer	Club	Goals
1	(France) Simon Hébras	Niort	15
2	(France) Marvin Seck	Vendée Luçon	14
3	(France) Fousseyni Cissé	Le Mans B	11
3	(Senegal) El-Hadji Arona Niang	Albi	11
5	(Republic of the Congo) Walter Bakouma	Les Herbiers	10
5	(France) Arnaud Gonzalez	Niort	10
7	(Guinea) Aboubacar Sylla	Montluçon	9
8	(France) Romain Dupuy	Libourne-Saint-Seurin	8
8	(France) Walid Khabat	Aurillac	8
8	(France) Anas Zahrawi	Vendée Luçon	8

=== Groupe D ===
Rank	Scorer	Club	Goals
1	(France) Khalid Souhayli	Mantes	18
2	(France) Samir Malcuit	Racing	15
3	(France) Florian Coquio	Quevilly	11
3	(France) Julien Girard	Romorantin	11
5	(France) Andé Dona Ndoh	Le Havre B	10
5	(France) Kévin Lefaix	Orléans	10
7	(France) Mickaël Brisset	Ivry	8
7	(France) Guilherme Mauricio	La Vitréenne	8
7	(Cape Verde) Ryan Mendes da Graca	Le Havre B	8
7	(France) Jean-Marc Oroque	Sénart-Moissy	8
