= 2001–02 AC Ajaccio season =

AC Ajaccio
2001–02 season
- Head coach: Rolland Courbis
- Stadium: Stade François Coty
- French Division 2: 1st (promoted)
- Coupe de France: Round of 32
- Coupe de la Ligue: First round

The 2001–02 season was the 92nd season in the existence of AC Ajaccio and the club's third consecutive season in the second division of French football. In addition to the domestic league, AC Ajaccio competed in this season's editions of the Coupe de France and Coupe de la Ligue. The season started on 1 July 2001 and ended on 30 June 2002.

== Players ==
=== First-team squad ===
Note: Flags indicate national team as defined under FIFA eligibility rules; some limited exceptions apply. Players may hold more than one non-FIFA nationality.

No.	Pos.	Nation	Player
—	GK	FRA	Stéphane Trévisan
—	GK	FRA	Patrice Luzi
—	DF	FRA	Christophe Destruhaut
—	DF	FRA	Nicolas Plestan
—	DF	FRA	Sébastien Squillaci
—	DF	FRA	Eric Colling
—	DF	FRA	David Jaureguiberry
—	DF	MAR	Walid Regragui
—	DF	FRA	Nicolas Baudoin
—	DF	FRA	Stéphane Maurel
—	DF	FRA	Martial Robin
—	MF	FRA	Nicolas Sahnoun
—	MF	FRA	Grégory Ursule
—	MF	FRA	David Terrier

No.	Pos.	Nation	Player
—	MF	FRA	Fabrice Levrat
—	MF	FRA	Emmerick Darbelet
—	MF	FRA	Yannick Achard
—	MF	FRA	Cyril Granon
—	MF	FRA	Anthony Garcia
—	MF	FRA	Renaud Connen
—	FW	FRA	Samba N'Diaye
—	FW	FRA	David Faderne
—	FW	BRA	José Júnior
—	FW	FRA	Samassi Abou
—	FW	FRA	Xavier Bécas
—	FW	FRA	Romain Angeletti
—	FW	CIV	Michel Bassolé

== Transfers ==
=== In ===
No.	Pos	Player	Transferred from	Fee	Date	Source
–	MF	(Ivory Coast) Michel Bassolé			1 July 2001	
–	MF	(France) Xavier Bécas	(France) Sedan B		1 July 2001	
–	MF	(France) Emmerick Darbelet	(France) Amiens		1 July 2001	
–	FW	(Brazil) José Júnior	(Belgium) Beveren		1 July 2001	
–	GK	(France) Patrice Luzi	(France) Monaco B	Free	1 July 2001	
–	FW	(France) Samba N'Diaye	(France) Niort		1 July 2001	
–	GK	(France) Stéphane Trévisan	(France) Marseille		1 July 2001	
–	DF	(France) David Terrier	(France) Nice		1 August 2001	
–	DF	(France) Nicolas Plestan	(France) Monaco B	Loan	1 July 2001	
–	DF	(Morocco) Walid Regragui	(France) Toulouse	Free	20 November 2001	
–	FW	(France) David Faderne	(France) Caen		1 December 2001	
–	MF	(France) Nicolas Sahnoun	(France) Bordeaux B	Loan	1 January 2002	

=== Out ===
No.	Pos	Player	Transferred to	Fee	Date	Source
–	FW	(Ivory Coast) Servais Konan Kan	(Italy) Alzano Virescit		1 July 2001	
–	GK	(France) Thibault Maqua			1 July 2001	
–	FW	(Algeria) Farid Soudani	(France) AC Ajaccio B		1 July 2001	
–	GK	(Senegal) Tony Sylva	(France) Monaco		1 July 2001	
–	DF	(France) Yohan Toursel			1 July 2001	
–	DF	(France) Philippe Burle	(Spain) Racing Ferrol	Free	1 July 2001	
–	FW	(France) Vincent Petit	(Spain) CD Logroñés	Free	1 July 2001	
–	FW	(France) Steve Savidan	(France) Angers	Free	1 July 2001	
–	FW	(France) Nicolas Plestan	(France) Monaco	Loan return	1 January 2002	

== Pre-season and friendlies ==
Win Draw Loss

3 July 2001 Friendly	Lens (France)	1–1	(France) Ajaccio	Vichy, France
17:30 CEST (UTC+2)	Moreira 35'		Squillaci 2'

== Competitions ==
=== Overall record ===
Competition	First match	Last match	Starting round	Final position	Record							
Competition	First match	Last match	Starting round	Final position	Pld	W	D	L	GF	GA	GD	Win %
Division 2	28 July 2001	May 2002	Matchday 1	Winners	38	20	12	6	47	25	+22	52.63
Coupe de France	November 2001	TBD	Seventh round	Round of 32	4	3	0	1	8	2	+6	75.00
Coupe de la Ligue	1 September 2001		First round	First round	1	0	1	0	0	0	+0	0.00
Total					43	23	13	7	55	27	+28	53.49

Source: Competitions

=== French Division 2 ===
==== League table ====
Pos	Team	Pld	W	D	L	GF	GA	GD	Pts	Promotion or Relegation
1	Ajaccio (C, P)	38	20	12	6	47	25	+22	72	Promotion to Ligue 1
2	Strasbourg (P)	38	19	11	8	47	27	+20	68	Promotion to Ligue 1
3	Nice (P)	38	20	6	12	56	40	+16	66	Promotion to Ligue 1
4	Le Havre (P)	38	17	14	7	56	32	+24	65	Promotion to Ligue 1
5	Le Mans	38	16	10	12	48	41	+7	58	

Source: Ligue 2
(C) Champions; (P) Promoted

==== Results summary ====
Overall								Home						Away					
Pld	W	D	L	GF	GA	GD	Pts	W	D	L	GF	GA	GD	W	D	L	GF	GA	GD
38	20	12	6	47	25	+22	72	13	5	1	29	10	+19	7	7	5	18	15	+3

Source: Ligue 2

==== Results by round ====
Round	1	2	3	4	5	6	7	8	9	10	11	12	13	14	15	16	17	18	19	20	21	22	23	24	25	26	27	28	29	30	31	32	33	34	35	36	37	38
Ground	H	A	H	A	H	A	H	A	A	H	A	H	A	H	A	H	A	H	A	H	A	H	A	H	A	H	H	A	H	A	H	A	H	A	H	A	H	A
Result	W	W	D	W	W	L	W	W	D	D	W	D	L	W	L	W	D	W	D	L	D	W	L	W	D	W	D	D	W	W	D	D	W	W	W	W	W	L
Position	1	1	2	3	2	3	2	1	1	1	1	1	3	2	3	2	3	2	2	3	4	4	4	4	4	3	2	3	2	2	1	1	1	1	1	1	1	1

Source: Ligue 2
A = Away; H = Home; W = Win; D = Draw; L = Loss

==== Matches ====
28 July 2001 1	Ajaccio	4–2	Nancy	Ajaccio
20:00 CEST (UTC+2)	Colling 45'; Squillaci 52'; Abou 55'; Granon 90'	Report	Fouret 42'; Chabaud 59'	Stadium: Stade François Coty; Attendance: 2,114; Referee: Patrick Lhermite

4 August 2001 2	Châteauroux	0–2	Ajaccio	Châteauroux
20:00 CEST (UTC+2)		Report	Colling 44' (pen.); Granon 60'	Stadium: Stade Gaston-Petit; Referee: Bertrand Layec

11 August 2001 3	Ajaccio	1–1	Caen	Ajaccio
20:00 CEST (UTC+2)	Squillaci 82'	Report	Gravelaine 12'	Stadium: Stade François Coty; Referee: Éric Poulat

18 August 2001 4	Créteil	0–2	Ajaccio	Créteil
--:-- CEST (UTC+2)				Stadium: Stade Dominique Duvauchelle

25 August 2001 5	Ajaccio	1–0	Le Mans	Ajaccio
--:-- CEST (UTC+2)				Stadium: Stade François Coty

28 August 2001 6	Saint-Étienne	1–0	Ajaccio	Saint-Étienne
--:-- CEST (UTC+2)				Stadium: Stade Geoffroy-Guichard

8 September 2001 7	Ajaccio	2–0	Wasquehal	Ajaccio
--:-- CEST (UTC+2)				Stadium: Stade François Coty

15 September 2001 8	Grenoble	0–1	Ajaccio	Grenoble
--:-- CEST (UTC+2)				Stadium: Stade Lesdiguières

22 September 2001 9	Amiens	1–1	Ajaccio	Amiens
--:-- CEST (UTC+2)				Stadium: Stade de la Licorne

29 September 2001 10	Ajaccio	1–1	Istres	Ajaccio
--:-- CEST (UTC+2)				Stadium: Stade François Coty

5 October 2001 11	Martigues	0–1	Ajaccio	Martigues
--:-- CEST (UTC+2)				Stadium: Stade Francis Turcan

12 October 2001 12	Ajaccio	1–1	Gueugnon	Ajaccio
--:-- CEST (UTC+2)				Stadium: Stade François Coty

20 October 2001 13	Nice	3–1	Ajaccio	Nice
--:-- CEST (UTC+2)				Stadium: Stade du Ray

27 October 2001 14	Ajaccio	2–1	Strasbourg	Ajaccio
--:-- CEST (UTC+2)				Stadium: Stade François Coty

9 November 2001 15	Laval	2–1	Ajaccio	Laval
--:-- CEST (UTC+2)				Stadium: Stade Francis Le Basser

13 November 2001 16	Ajaccio	3–0	Le Havre	Ajaccio
--:-- CEST (UTC+2)				Stadium: Stade François Coty

17 November 2001 17	Niort	0–0	Ajaccio	Niort
--:-- CEST (UTC+2)				Stadium: Stade René Gaillard

28 November 2001 18	Ajaccio	3–1	Nîmes	Ajaccio
--:-- CEST (UTC+2)				Stadium: Stade François Coty

7 December 2001 19	Beauvais	0–0	Ajaccio	Beauvais
--:-- CEST (UTC+2)				Stadium: Stade Pierre Brisson

19 December 2001 20	Ajaccio	0–1	Châteauroux	Ajaccio
--:-- CEST (UTC+2)				Stadium: Stade François Coty

22 December 2001 21	Caen	1–1	Ajaccio	Caen
--:-- CEST (UTC+2)				Stadium: Stade Michel d'Ornano

5 January 2002 22	Ajaccio	1–0	Créteil	Ajaccio
--:-- CEST (UTC+2)				Stadium: Stade François Coty

12 January 2002 23	Le Mans	2–1	Ajaccio	Le Mans
--:-- CEST (UTC+2)				Stadium: Stade Léon-Bollée

23 January 2002 24	Ajaccio	1–0	Saint-Étienne	Ajaccio
--:-- CEST (UTC+2)				Stadium: Stade François Coty

30 January 2002 25	Wasquehal	1–1	Ajaccio	Villeneuve-d'Ascq
--:-- CEST (UTC+2)				Stadium: Stadium Lille Métropole

2 February 2002 26	Ajaccio	2–0	Grenoble	Ajaccio
--:-- CEST (UTC+2)				Stadium: Stade François Coty

6 February 2002 27	Ajaccio	1–1	Amiens	Ajaccio
--:-- CEST (UTC+2)				Stadium: Stade François Coty

12 February 2002 28	Istres	2–2	Ajaccio	Istres
--:-- CEST (UTC+2)				Stadium: Stade Bernard Bardin

16 February 2002 29	Ajaccio	1–0	Martigues	Ajaccio
--:-- CEST (UTC+2)				Stadium: Stade François Coty

24 February 2002 30	Gueugnon	1–2	Ajaccio	Gueugnon
--:-- CEST (UTC+2)				Stadium: Stade Jean Laville

6 March 2002 31	Ajaccio	1–1	Nice	Ajaccio
--:-- CEST (UTC+2)				Stadium: Stade François Coty

15 March 2002 32	Strasbourg	0–0	Ajaccio	Strasbourg
--:-- CEST (UTC+2)				Stadium: Stade de la Meinau

22 March 2002 33	Ajaccio	2–0	Laval	Ajaccio
--:-- CEST (UTC+2)				Stadium: Stade François Coty

26 March 2002 34	Le Havre	0–1	Ajaccio	Le Havre
--:-- CEST (UTC+2)				Stadium: Stade Jules Deschaseaux

6 April 2002 35	Ajaccio	1–0	Niort	Ajaccio
--:-- CEST (UTC+2)				Stadium: Stade François Coty

14 April 2002 36	Nîmes	0–1	Ajaccio	Nîmes
--:-- CEST (UTC+2)				Stadium: Stade des Costières

26 April 2002 37	Ajaccio	1–0	Beauvais	Ajaccio
--:-- CEST (UTC+2)				Stadium: Stade François Coty

3 May 2002 38	Nancy	1–0	Ajaccio	Tomblaine
--:-- CEST (UTC+2)				Stadium: Stade Marcel Picot

=== Coupe de la Ligue ===
1 September 2001 First round	Ajaccio	0–0 (a.e.t.) (3–4 p)	Nîmes	Ajaccio
--:-- CEST (UTC+2)				Stadium: Stade François Coty

== Statistics ==
=== Squad statistics ===
No.	Pos	Nat	Player	Total		Division 2		Coupe de France		Coupe de la Ligue			
No.	Pos	Nat	Player	Apps	Goals	Apps	Goals	Apps	Goals	Apps	Goals		
Goalkeepers
1	GK	(France) FRA	[[]]	0	0	0	0	0	0	0	0	0	0
1	GK	(France) FRA	[[]]	0	0	0	0	0	0	0	0	0	0
Defenders
1	DF	(France) FRA	[[]]	0	0	0	0	0	0	0	0	0	0
1	DF	(France) FRA	[[]]	0	0	0	0	0	0	0	0	0	0
Midfielders
1	MF	(France) FRA	[[]]	0	0	0	0	0	0	0	0	0	0
1	MF	(France) FRA	[[]]	0	0	0	0	0	0	0	0	0	0
Forwards
1	FW	(France) FRA	[[]]	0	0	0	0	0	0	0	0	0	0
1	FW	(France) FRA	[[]]	0	0	0	0	0	0	0	0	0	0
Players who have made an appearance or had a squad number this season but have left the club
1	GK	(France) FRA	[[]]	0	0	0	0	0	0	0	0	0	0

=== Goalscorers ===
Rank	No.	Pos	Nat	Name	Division 2	Coupe de France	Coupe de la Ligue	Total	
1	1	FW	(France)	[[]]	0	0	0	0	
2	2	MF	(France)	[[]]	0	0	0	0	
2	Totals					0	0	0	0
