= 2001–02 AS Beauvais Oise season =

AS Beauvais Oise
2001–02 season
- Head coach: Jacky Bonnevay
- Stadium: Stade Pierre Brisson
- French Division 2: 7th
- Coupe de France: Eighth round
- Coupe de la Ligue: First round

The 2001–02 season was the 57th season in the existence of AS Beauvais Oise and the club's third consecutive season in the second division of French football. In addition to the domestic league, AS Beauvais Oise competed in this season's edition of the Coupe de France and Coupe de la Ligue. The season covered the period from 1 July 2001 to 30 June 2002.

== Players ==
=== First-team squad ===
Note: Flags indicate national team as defined under FIFA eligibility rules; some limited exceptions apply. Players may hold more than one non-FIFA nationality.

| No. | Pos. | Nation | Player |
|---|---|---|---|
| — | GK | FRA | Laurent Weber |
| — | GK | FRA | Cédric Massé |
| — | GK | FRA | Léonardo Lopez |
| — | DF | FRA | David Vairelles |
| — | DF | FRA | Jean-Marc Moulin |
| — | DF | FRA | Alexandre Clément |
| — | DF | FRA | Gaël Sanz |
| — | DF | FRA | Mickaël Rodrigues |
| — | DF | FRA | Stéphane Zèbre |
| — | DF | FRA | Hervé Fischer |
| — | DF | FRA | Arnaud Berdou |
| — | DF | FRA | Yohan Démont |
| — | DF | MTQ | Rémi Maréval |
| — | MF | FRA | Sophiane Baghdad |
| — | MF | FRA | Jean-Marc Oroque |

| No. | Pos. | Nation | Player |
|---|---|---|---|
| — | MF | FRA | Guillaume Beuzelin |
| — | MF | NGA | Egutu Oliseh |
| — | MF | FRA | David De Freitas |
| — | MF | CTA | Gildas Dambeti |
| — | MF | FRA | Grégory Christ |
| — | MF | FRA | Cédric Pardeilhan |
| — | MF | FRA | Jessy Savine |
| — | MF | FRA | Nicolas Girard |
| — | MF | FRA | Frédéric Machado |
| — | FW | FRA | Grégory Thil |
| — | FW | FRA | Sébastien Heitzmann |
| — | FW | FRA | Jérôme Bottelin |
| — | FW | CIV | Marc-Eric Gueï |
| — | FW | FRA | Jérôme Lempereur |

== Pre-season and friendlies ==
Win Draw Loss Fixtures

| 20 April 2002 Friendly | Paris Saint-Germain (France) | 0–1 | (France) Beauvais | Saint-Germain-en-Laye, France |
| | | | Savine | Stadium: Stade Municipal Georges Lefèvre |
Note: Match was played in three 30-minute periods.

| 10 May 2002 Friendly | Lens (France) | 1–0 | (France) Beauvais | Saint-Omer, France |
| 20:00 CEST (UTC+2) | Bejbl 60' | | | Stadium: Stade Gaston Bonnet; Attendance: 2,300; Referee: M. Gautier |

== Competitions ==
=== Overall record ===
| Competition | First match | Last match | Starting round | Final position | Record | | | | | | | |
| Competition | First match | Last match | Starting round | Final position | Pld | W | D | L | GF | GA | GD | Win % |
|---|---|---|---|---|---|---|---|---|---|---|---|---|
| Division 2 | 28 July 2001 | 3 May 2002 | Matchday 1 | 7th | 38 | 13 | 18 | 7 | 37 | 25 | +12 | 34.21 |
| Coupe de France | 3 November 2001 | 23 November 2001 | Seventh round | Eighth round | 2 | 1 | 0 | 1 | 1 | 2 | −1 | 50.00 |
| Coupe de la Ligue | September 2001 | | First round | First round | 1 | 0 | 0 | 1 | 0 | 1 | −1 | 0.00 |
| Total | | | | | 41 | 14 | 18 | 9 | 38 | 28 | +10 | 34.15 |

Source: Competitions

=== French Division 2 ===
==== League table ====
| Pos | Team | Pld | W | D | L | GF | GA | GD | Pts |
|---|---|---|---|---|---|---|---|---|---|
| 5 | Le Mans | 38 | 16 | 10 | 12 | 48 | 41 | +7 | 58 |
| 6 | Caen | 38 | 16 | 10 | 12 | 59 | 55 | +4 | 58 |
| 7 | Beauvais | 38 | 13 | 18 | 7 | 37 | 25 | +12 | 57 |
| 8 | Châteauroux | 38 | 15 | 8 | 15 | 41 | 42 | −1 | 53 |
| 9 | Nancy | 38 | 12 | 15 | 11 | 42 | 38 | +4 | 51 |

Source: Ligue 2

==== Results summary ====
| Overall | | | | | | | | Home | | | | | | Away | | | | | |
| Pld | W | D | L | GF | GA | GD | Pts | W | D | L | GF | GA | GD | W | D | L | GF | GA | GD |
|---|---|---|---|---|---|---|---|---|---|---|---|---|---|---|---|---|---|---|---|
| 38 | 13 | 18 | 7 | 37 | 25 | +12 | 57 | 7 | 9 | 3 | 18 | 10 | +8 | 6 | 9 | 4 | 19 | 15 | +4 |

Source: Ligue 2

==== Results by round ====
| Round | 1 | 2 | 3 | 4 | 5 | 6 | 7 | 8 | 9 | 10 | 11 | 12 | 13 | 14 | 15 | 16 | 17 | 18 | 19 | 20 | 21 | 22 | 23 | 24 | 25 | 26 | 27 | 28 | 29 | 30 | 31 | 32 | 33 | 34 | 35 | 36 | 37 | 38 |
|---|---|---|---|---|---|---|---|---|---|---|---|---|---|---|---|---|---|---|---|---|---|---|---|---|---|---|---|---|---|---|---|---|---|---|---|---|---|---|
| Ground | A | H | A | H | A | H | A | H | A | H | H | A | H | A | H | A | H | A | H | A | H | A | H | A | H | A | H | A | A | H | A | H | A | H | A | H | A | H |
| Result | W | L | W | W | W | W | D | W | D | L | W | D | W | D | D | D | W | L | D | D | W | W | D | W | D | D | D | D | W | L | D | D | L | D | L | D | L | D |
| Position | 8 | 9 | 4 | 4 | 4 | 1 | 3 | 2 | 2 | 2 | 2 | 2 | 1 | 1 | 2 | 3 | 2 | 3 | 3 | 4 | 2 | 2 | 2 | 2 | 2 | 4 | 3 | 4 | 3 | 4 | 3 | 4 | 4 | 5 | 5 | 6 | 6 | 7 |

Source: Ligue 2
A = Away; H = Home; W = Win; D = Draw; L = Loss

==== Matches ====
| 28 July 2001 1 | Amiens | 0–1 | Beauvais | Amiens |
| --:-- CEST (UTC+2) | | | | Stadium: Stade de la Licorne |

| 4 August 2001 2 | Beauvais | 0–1 | Gueugnon | Beauvais |
| --:-- CEST (UTC+2) | | | | Stadium: Stade Pierre Brisson |

| 11 August 2001 3 | Martigues | 0–2 | Beauvais | Martigues |
| --:-- CEST (UTC+2) | | | | Stadium: Stade Francis Turcan |

| 18 August 2001 4 | Beauvais | 1–0 | Nice | Beauvais |
| --:-- CEST (UTC+2) | | | | Stadium: Stade Pierre Brisson |

| 25 August 2001 5 | Istres | 0–2 | Beauvais | Istres |
| --:-- CEST (UTC+2) | | | | Stadium: Stade Bernard Bardin |

| 29 August 2001 6 | Beauvais | 2–0 | Laval | Beauvais |
| --:-- CEST (UTC+2) | | | | Stadium: Stade Pierre Brisson |

| 8 September 2001 7 | Le Havre | 0–0 | Beauvais | Le Havre |
| --:-- CEST (UTC+2) | | | | Stadium: Stade Jules Deschaseaux |

| 16 September 2001 8 | Beauvais | 1–0 | Strasbourg | Beauvais |
| --:-- CEST (UTC+2) | | | | Stadium: Stade Pierre Brisson |

| 23 September 2001 9 | Niort | 0–0 | Beauvais | Niort |
| --:-- CEST (UTC+2) | | | | Stadium: Stade René Gaillard |

| 29 September 2001 10 | Beauvais | 1–3 | Nîmes | Beauvais |
| --:-- CEST (UTC+2) | | | | Stadium: Stade Pierre Brisson |

| 5 October 2001 11 | Beauvais | 3–0 | Saint-Étienne | Beauvais |
| --:-- CEST (UTC+2) | | | | Stadium: Stade Pierre Brisson |

| 13 October 2001 12 | Nancy | 2–2 | Beauvais | Tomblaine |
| --:-- CEST (UTC+2) | | | | Stadium: Stade Marcel Picot |

| 20 October 2001 13 | Beauvais | 1–0 | Grenoble | Beauvais |
| --:-- CEST (UTC+2) | | | | Stadium: Stade Pierre Brisson |

| 27 October 2001 14 | Châteauroux | 0–0 | Beauvais | Châteauroux |
| --:-- CEST (UTC+2) | | | | Stadium: Stade Gaston-Petit |

| 8 November 2001 15 | Beauvais | 1–1 | Caen | Beauvais |
| --:-- CEST (UTC+2) | | | | Stadium: Stade Pierre Brisson |

| 13 November 2001 16 | Le Mans | 2–2 | Beauvais | Le Mans |
| --:-- CEST (UTC+2) | | | | Stadium: Stade Léon-Bollée |

| 17 November 2001 17 | Beauvais | 2–0 | Créteil | Beauvais |
| --:-- CEST (UTC+2) | | | | Stadium: Stade Pierre Brisson |

| 28 November 2001 18 | Wasquehal | 3–2 | Beauvais | Villeneuve-d'Ascq |
| --:-- CEST (UTC+2) | | | | Stadium: Stadium Lille Métropole |

| 7 December 2001 19 | Beauvais | 0–0 | Ajaccio | Beauvais |
| --:-- CEST (UTC+2) | | | | Stadium: Stade Pierre Brisson |

| 19 December 2001 20 | Gueugnon | 0–0 | Beauvais | Gueugnon |
| --:-- CEST (UTC+2) | | | | Stadium: Stade Jean Laville |

| 22 December 2001 21 | Beauvais | 2–0 | Martigues | Beauvais |
| --:-- CEST (UTC+2) | | | | Stadium: Stade Pierre Brisson |

| 5 January 2002 22 | Nice | 0–1 | Beauvais | Nice |
| --:-- CEST (UTC+2) | | | | Stadium: Stade du Ray |

| 12 January 2002 23 | Beauvais | 0–0 | Istres | Beauvais |
| --:-- CEST (UTC+2) | | | | Stadium: Stade Pierre Brisson |

| 23 January 2002 24 | Laval | 0–1 | Beauvais | Laval |
| --:-- CEST (UTC+2) | | | | Stadium: Stade Francis Le Basser |

| 29 January 2002 25 | Beauvais | 1–1 | Le Havre | Beauvais |
| --:-- CEST (UTC+2) | | | | Stadium: Stade Pierre Brisson |

| 3 February 2002 26 | Strasbourg | 1–1 | Beauvais | Strasbourg |
| --:-- CEST (UTC+2) | | | | Stadium: Stade de la Meinau |

| 6 February 2002 27 | Beauvais | 0–0 | Niort | Beauvais |
| --:-- CEST (UTC+2) | | | | Stadium: Stade Pierre Brisson |

| 12 February 2002 28 | Nîmes | 1–1 | Beauvais | Nîmes |
| --:-- CEST (UTC+2) | | | | Stadium: Stade des Costières |

| 17 February 2002 29 | Saint-Étienne | 1–2 | Beauvais | Saint-Étienne |
| --:-- CEST (UTC+2) | | | | Stadium: Stade Geoffroy-Guichard |

| 23 February 2002 30 | Beauvais | 0–1 | Nancy | Beauvais |
| --:-- CEST (UTC+2) | | | | Stadium: Stade Pierre Brisson |

| 6 March 2002 31 | Grenoble | 0–0 | Beauvais | Grenoble |
| --:-- CEST (UTC+2) | | | | Stadium: Stade Lesdiguières |

| 16 March 2002 32 | Beauvais | 1–1 | Châteauroux | Beauvais |
| --:-- CEST (UTC+2) | | | | Stadium: Stade Pierre Brisson |

| 22 March 2002 33 | Caen | 3–2 | Beauvais | Caen |
| --:-- CEST (UTC+2) | | | | Stadium: Stade Michel d'Ornano |

| 26 March 2002 34 | Beauvais | 1–1 | Le Mans | Beauvais |
| --:-- CEST (UTC+2) | | | | Stadium: Stade Pierre Brisson |

| 6 April 2002 35 | Créteil | 1–0 | Beauvais | Créteil |
| --:-- CEST (UTC+2) | | | | Stadium: Stade Dominique Duvauchelle |

| 13 April 2002 36 | Beauvais | 0–0 | Wasquehal | Beauvais |
| --:-- CEST (UTC+2) | | | | Stadium: Stade Pierre Brisson |

| 26 April 2002 37 | Ajaccio | 1–0 | Beauvais | Ajaccio |
| --:-- CEST (UTC+2) | | | | Stadium: Stade François Coty |

| 3 May 2002 38 | Beauvais | 1–1 | Amiens | Beauvais |
| 20:00 CEST (UTC+2) | | Report | | Stadium: Stade Pierre Brisson; Referee: Gilles Chéron |

=== Coupe de la Ligue ===
| 1 September 2001 First round | Laval | 1–0 | Beauvais | Laval |
| --:-- CEST (UTC+2) | | | | Stadium: Stade Francis Le Basser |

== Statistics ==
=== Squad statistics ===
| No. | Pos | Nat | Player | Total | | Division 2 | | Coupe de France | | Coupe de la Ligue | | | |
| No. | Pos | Nat | Player | Apps | Goals | Apps | Goals | Apps | Goals | Apps | Goals | | |
Goalkeepers
| 1 | GK | (France) FRA | [[]] | 0 | 0 | 0 | 0 | 0 | 0 | 0 | 0 | 0 | 0 |
| 1 | GK | (France) FRA | [[]] | 0 | 0 | 0 | 0 | 0 | 0 | 0 | 0 | 0 | 0 |
Defenders
| 1 | DF | (France) FRA | [[]] | 0 | 0 | 0 | 0 | 0 | 0 | 0 | 0 | 0 | 0 |
| 1 | DF | (France) FRA | [[]] | 0 | 0 | 0 | 0 | 0 | 0 | 0 | 0 | 0 | 0 |
Midfielders
| 1 | MF | (France) FRA | [[]] | 0 | 0 | 0 | 0 | 0 | 0 | 0 | 0 | 0 | 0 |
| 1 | MF | (France) FRA | [[]] | 0 | 0 | 0 | 0 | 0 | 0 | 0 | 0 | 0 | 0 |
Forwards
| 1 | FW | (France) FRA | [[]] | 0 | 0 | 0 | 0 | 0 | 0 | 0 | 0 | 0 | 0 |
| 1 | FW | (France) FRA | [[]] | 0 | 0 | 0 | 0 | 0 | 0 | 0 | 0 | 0 | 0 |
Players who have made an appearance or had a squad number this season but have left the club
| 1 | GK | (France) FRA | [[]] | 0 | 0 | 0 | 0 | 0 | 0 | 0 | 0 | 0 | 0 |

=== Goalscorers ===
| Rank | No. | Pos | Nat | Name | Division 2 | Coupe de France | Coupe de la Ligue | Total | |
|---|---|---|---|---|---|---|---|---|---|
| 1 | 1 | FW | (France) | [[]] | 0 | 0 | 0 | 0 | |
| 2 | 2 | MF | (France) | [[]] | 0 | 0 | 0 | 0 | |
| 2 | Totals | | | | | 0 | 0 | 0 | 0 |
