= 2011–12 Championnat de France Amateur =

Championnat de France amateur
- Season: 2011–12
- Champions: CA Bastia
- Promoted: Bourg-Péronnas; Carquefou; Uzès Pont du Gard
- Relegated: Albi; Avion; Gap; Jura Sud; La Vitréenne; Lorient B Villemomble
- Matches: 1,187
- Goals: 3,022 (2.55 per match)
- Top goalscorer: Steven Papin (16 goals)
- Biggest home win: Metz B 9–0 Jura Sud (21 April 2012)
- Biggest away win: Vendée Luçon 0–7 Romorantin (31 March 2012)
- Highest scoring: Valenciennes B 6–3 Calvi (8 October 2011); Metz B 9–0 Jura Sud (21 April 2012); Yzeure 7–2 Sarre-Union (2 June 2012)
- Longest winning run: 4 games Dunkerque (3 September – 24 September); Valence (3 September – 25 September)
- Longest unbeaten run: 10 games Pontivy (14 August – 5 November)
- Longest winless run: 27 games Gap (17 September – 2 June)
- Longest losing run: 6 games Monts d'Or Azergues (14 August – 25 September)

The 2011–12 Championnat de France amateur season was the 14th since its establishment. Gazélec Ajaccio was the previous season's club champions, while the reserve team of professional club Lyon were the defending reserve team champions. The teams and groups was announced on 18 July 2011 and the fixtures were determined on 28 July. The season began on 13 August 2011 and ended on 2 June 2012. The winter break was in effect from 23 December to 6 January.

== Teams ==
There were ten promoted teams from the Championnat de France amateur 2, replacing the 12 teams that were relegated from the Championnat de France amateur following the 2010–11 season. A total of 72 teams competed in the league with seven clubs suffering relegation to the fifth division, the Championnat de France amateur 2. All non-reserve clubs that secured league status for the season were subject to approval by the DNCG before becoming eligible to participate in the competition.

=== Promotion and relegation ===
Teams relegated to Championnat de France amateur

- Alfortville
- Bayonne
- Plabennec
- Rodez

Teams promoted to Championnat de France amateur

- AC Amiens
- Bordeaux B (Note: Promoted to the Championnat de France amateur in place of Chambéry who were administratively relegated back to the Championnat de France amateur 2 by the DNCG.)
- Concarneau
- Dunkerque
- Marseille Consolat
- Mont-de-Marsan
- Pontivy
- Sarre-Union (Note: Promoted to the Championnat de France amateur in place of Strasbourg B who cannot appear in the same division as its parent club.)
- Saumur
- Valenciennes B

=== DNCG rulings ===
On 26 May 2011, following a preliminary review of each club's administrative and financial accounts in the Championnat National, the DNCG ruled that Pacy Vallée-d'Eure, Strasbourg, Gap, Grenoble, and Cannes would be relegated to the Championnat de France amateur (CFA) after the organization determined that the clubs were enduring financial difficulties. The organization also excluded Toulon from participating in the CFA and relegated both Agde and Chambéry to the fifth division. On 4 June, the DNCG announced that, for the second consecutive season, Calais would not be allowed to ascend to the CFA. All clubs had the option to appeal the rulings.

On 24 June 2011, Pacy Vallée-d'Eure officials confirmed in a press conference that it would accept its relegation to the fourth division in an effort to smooth over its €350,000 debt into next year. Two weeks later, on 4 July, Grenoble confirmed on its website that the Appeals Board of the DNCG had informed club officials that it will be relegated to the fourth division. Grenoble, subsequently, entered liquidation on 7 July, which made the club unable to participate in the CFA. On the same day as the Grenoble ruling, the DNCG also rejected the appeals of Toulon and Calais. On 8 July 2011, the Appeals Board of the DNCG confirmed that both Strasbourg and Gap would remain relegated after the clubs failed to convince the board of its intent to fix its financial liabilities. Strasbourg has a deficit of over €4 million, while Gap's debt has exceeded over €80,000. Following the appeal denial, Gap officials announced that the club would appeal to the CNOSF, the National Sporting Committee of France. On 13 July, Agde successfully appealed to the DNCG and was, subsequently, re-instated into the CFA, while Chambéry had its appeal rejected.

On 19 July, Cannes had its appeal to remain in the Championnat National rejected by the DNCG. Similar to Gap, following the decision, Cannes announced its intent to appeal the ruling at the CNOSF. On 29 July, the CNOSF gave a favorable ruling for Cannes recommending to the federation that Cannes should remain in the third division. On 3 August, the CNOSF confirmed the demotion of Gap to the Championnat de France amateur. The French Football Federation determined whether Cannes would be allowed to participate in the league on 4 August, one day before the season was set to begin at the federation's annual executive meeting. At the meeting, the Federation re-affirmed its decision to relegate Cannes to the CFA stating it "trust the DNCG and followed its decisions". On 24 August, the Executive Committee of the French Football Federation announced that RC Strasbourg would be relegated to the CFA 2 after a Strasbourg tribunal ordered the club to enter liquidation. No club was named in Strasbourg's place, which left Group B with 17 clubs.

== League tables ==
=== Group A ===
Pos	Team	Pld	W	D	L	GF	GA	GD	Pts	Promotion or relegation
1	CA Bastia (P)	34	20	7	7	53	33	+20	101	Promotion to 2012–13 Championnat National
2	Aubervilliers	34	19	7	8	53	34	+19	98	
3	Dunkerque	34	17	12	5	50	31	+19	97	
4	Auxerre Reserves	34	19	5	10	60	36	+24	96	Championnat de France amateur Playoffs
5	Drancy	34	15	10	9	35	32	+3	88 (Note: Drancy was docked one point.)	
6	Calvi	34	13	11	10	58	51	+7	84	
7	Lens Reserves	34	13	11	10	47	39	+8	84	
8	AC Amiens	34	14	8	12	41	40	+1	84	
9	Ivry	34	14	7	13	50	40	+10	83	
10	Lille Reserves	34	13	10	11	44	42	+2	82 (Note: Lille B was docked one point as a result of the forfeiture of an April 2012 match against CA Bastia)	
11	Compiègne	34	12	7	15	44	52	−8	77	
12	Poissy	34	7	17	10	43	47	−4	72	
13	Valenciennes Reserves	34	11	5	18	44	52	−8	72	
14	Paris Saint-Germain Reserves	34	8	11	15	32	38	−6	69	
15	Alfortville	34	7	11	16	36	55	−19	66	
16	Sénart-Moissy (D, R)	34	6	13	15	22	45	−23	65	Relegation to 2012–13 Championnat de France amateur 2
17	Villemomble (R)	34	6	12	16	24	47	−23	64	Relegation to 2012–13 Championnat de France amateur 2
18	Avion (R)	34	5	10	19	34	57	−23	59	Relegation to 2012–13 Championnat de France amateur 2

Updated to match(es) played on 2 June 2012. Source: French Football Federation
Rules for classification: 1) points; 2) goal difference; 3) number of goals scored.
(D) Disqualified; (P) Promoted; (R) Relegated

==== Results ====
Home \ Away	UJA	AAC	AUB	AUX	AVI	CAB	CLV	COM	DRN	DUN	IVR	LEN	LIL	PSGR	POI	SEN	VAL	VMB
Alfortville		0–1	2–3	3–1	2–2	0–3	0–1	0–1	2–1	2–2	0–0	1–1	0–0	1–5	2–0	1–1	0–0	1–1
AC Amiens	0–2		1–0	0–5	1–0	1–3	0–2	3–1	0–1	0–0	1–3	1–1	4–0	1–0	2–2	0–0	3–1	2–1
Aubervilliers	1–1	2–2		1–0	2–1	2–0	2–0	1–1	2–0	2–2	2–0	3–1	0–0	1–0	1–4	1–0	0–2	2–0
Auxerre Reserves	3–1	3–1	1–0		4–0	0–0	3–2	4–1	1–0	1–2	2–1	0–2	4–0	2–0	3–3	1–1	2–0	3–0
Avion	3–0	0–1	0–2	1–2		2–3	1–1	2–2	1–1	0–1	2–3	0–3	2–0	0–1	0–0	0–0	1–2	3–0
CA Bastia	3–1	1–0	1–0	2–0	2–1		2–0	3–0	4–1	3–2	1–0	2–1	3–0	3–1	3–3	0–0	2–0	2–0
Calvi	2–0	1–0	2–4	0–1	4–1	0–2		1–1	1–1	3–3	2–0	2–2	0–0	3–2	4–1	1–1	4–0	2–1
Compiègne	2–1	0–3	0–3	0–1	3–0	2–0	3–2		1–0	1–1	0–1	2–0	2–1	1–4	2–1	1–1	1–0	3–0
Drancy	1–1	2–1	1–1	1–1	2–1	1–0	3–1	3–1		0–0	1–0	2–1	0–1	2–0	1–0	1–0	1–0	1–1
Dunkerque	1–0	1–0	2–0	3–1	1–0	2–0	2–2	2–1	0–1		1–0	1–2	0–0	1–1	2–0	4–0	0–2	1–1
Ivry	1–0	2–3	1–2	0–0	1–1	3–1	2–4	4–1	1–1	4–1		0–0	1–2	1–0	1–2	4–0	4–2	3–0
Lens Reserves	5–2	0–0	3–2	0–4	0–1	5–0	1–2	1–0	3–0	1–3	1–1		1–0	1–1	0–0	2–1	1–1	1–2
Lille Reserves	2–3	1–2	0–2	2–0	4–2	3–1	5–1	3–3	1–2	0–1	3–1	1–1		1–0	1–1	2–1	0–0	3–0
Paris Saint-Germain Reserves	2–3	1–1	1–2	1–2	1–1	0–0	0–0	1–0	0–0	1–1	0–2	1–2	1–1		1–0	0–2	2–1	1–0
Poissy	1–1	1–1	2–4	4–1	0–0	0–0	1–1	3–2	1–1	0–1	1–3	0–0	2–2	0–0		2–1	3–1	0–0
Sénart-Moissy	1–0	1–3	1–0	2–4	0–2	1–1	0–4	1–0	2–0	0–3	1–1	0–2	0–1	0–2	1–1		1–1	0–0
Valenciennes Reserves	2–3	2–1	1–2	1–0	5–0	0–1	6–3	0–4	2–1	0–1	0–1	2–3	1–2	1–1	3–2	0–1		2–1
Villemomble	2–0	0–1	1–1	1–0	3–3	1–1	0–0	1–1	0–1	2–2	2–0	1–0	0–2	1–0	1–2	0–0	0–3	

Updated to match(es) played on 2 June 2012. Source: French Football Federation
Legend: Blue = home team win; Yellow = draw; Red = away team win.

=== Group B ===
Pos	Team	Pld	W	D	L	GF	GA	GD	Pts	Promotion or relegation
1	Lyon Reserves	32	19	9	4	72	35	+37	98	Championnat de France amateur Playoffs
2	Bourg-Péronnas (P)	32	18	8	6	56	26	+30	94	Promotion to 2012–13 Championnat National
3	Lyon Duchère	32	17	10	5	56	33	+23	93	
4	Raon-l'Étape	32	16	5	11	50	29	+21	85	
5	Metz Reserves	32	13	8	11	58	40	+18	79	
6	Valence	32	12	11	9	40	31	+9	79	
7	Yzeure	32	11	12	9	42	36	+6	77	
8	Mulhouse	32	10	13	9	44	40	+4	75	
9	Moulins	32	11	10	11	31	30	+1	75	
10	Nancy Reserves	32	10	12	10	34	42	−8	74	
11	Belfort	32	9	12	11	38	42	−4	71	
12	Villefranche	32	9	10	13	28	51	−23	69	
13	Sochaux Reserves	32	8	11	13	40	45	−5	67	
14	Monts d'Or Azergues	32	9	7	16	28	49	−21	66	
15	Amnéville	32	7	12	13	50	61	−11	65	
16	Sarre-Union	32	6	9	17	33	69	−36	59	
17	Jura Sud (R)	32	4	7	21	31	73	−42	51	Relegation to 2012–13 Championnat de France amateur 2

Updated to match(es) played on 2 June 2012. Source: French Football Federation
Rules for classification: 1) points; 2) goal difference; 3) number of goals scored.
(P) Promoted; (R) Relegated

==== Results ====
Home \ Away	AMN	BLF	BPE	JSF	LYD	LYO	MTZ	MDF	MOU	MUL	NCY	RLE	SAU	SCX	VAL	VFR	YZE
Amnéville		1–0	1–0	4–1	1–1	2–3	2–2	0–1	1–1	3–3	2–3	4–3	2–1	2–3	0–0	4–0	2–2
Belfort	0–2		1–1	2–3	1–1	1–2	0–2	3–0	1–1	4–1	1–0	0–0	2–0	1–1	1–0	0–0	2–1
Bourg-Péronnas	1–1	2–2		1–0	3–1	1–1	1–0	1–0	3–0	0–1	3–0	2–0	3–3	1–0	1–0	4–0	4–0
Jura Sud	4–1	1–1	1–4		1–2	0–3	1–2	0–2	3–1	0–3	1–1	0–2	0–1	0–2	1–1	3–1	1–1
Lyon Duchère	1–1	2–0	2–2	3–1		2–1	2–1	3–0	1–0	1–1	1–1	3–1	3–1	0–0	3–1	1–0	2–2
Lyon Reserves	3–0	3–3	4–2	3–0	1–1		2–1	4–0	2–1	2–0	4–2	2–1	5–0	1–0	0–0	3–1	1–1
Metz Reserves	3–2	0–3	0–0	9–0	0–0	1–1		4–1	0–0	0–1	3–1	2–1	4–1	3–0	2–0	6–1	1–0
Monts d'Or Azergues	2–1	1–1	1–3	1–0	2–0	2–3	4–4		0–1	0–3	0–0	0–0	0–2	2–1	0–1	1–3	1–0
Moulins	3–0	1–1	0–2	2–0	1–0	1–1	2–0	2–1		1–1	1–1	2–1	1–0	3–2	1–2	2–0	1–2
Mulhouse	3–1	0–1	0–3	0–0	3–2	2–2	0–0	1–1	0–0		1–1	0–2	5–1	1–1	1–2	1–1	1–1
Nancy Reserves	2–2	2–0	0–0	3–2	1–5	3–2	0–0	0–0	0–2	0–3		1–1	0–2	1–0	0–0	2–0	0–1
Raon-l'Étape	4–1	7–1	0–1	3–0	0–2	1–0	3–0	4–1	2–0	1–0	3–1		1–0	3–0	2–0	1–2	0–0
Sarre-Union	3–3	2–1	0–2	3–3	0–2	0–3	0–4	0–2	0–0	2–4	0–2	2–1		0–0	2–1	1–1	1–1
Sochaux Reserves	5–2	1–1	0–2	3–1	1–3	1–1	2–1	0–1	1–0	5–2	0–2	3–0	2–2		1–1	0–0	1–2
Valence	1–1	0–1	3–1	5–2	3–1	3–0	3–1	1–0	1–0	0–0	1–2	0–1	4–1	2–2		2–2	1–0
Villefranche	0–0	2–1	1–0	2–0	1–3	0–6	3–2	1–1	1–0	1–2	0–0	0–1	0–0	2–1	0–0		1–0
Yzeure	2–1	2–1	3–2	1–1	1–2	1–2	3–0	2–0	0–0	1–0	1–2	0–0	7–2	1–1	1–1	2–1	

Updated to match(es) played on 2 June 2012. Source: French Football Federation
Legend: Blue = home team win; Yellow = draw; Red = away team win.

=== Group C ===
Pos	Team	Pld	W	D	L	GF	GA	GD	Pts	Promotion or relegation
1	Uzès Pont du Gard (P)	34	20	10	4	55	29	+26	104	Promotion to 2012–13 Championnat National
2	Rodez	34	17	9	8	43	26	+17	94	
3	Monaco Reserves	34	17	5	12	56	47	+9	90	Championnat de France amateur Playoffs
4	Cannes	34	15	10	9	53	39	+14	87 (Note: Cannes was docked three points.)	
5	Hyères	34	14	11	9	40	43	−3	87	
6	Colomiers	34	13	14	7	45	30	+15	87	
7	Saint-Étienne Reserves	34	14	10	10	57	35	+22	86	
8	Bordeaux Reserves	34	14	7	13	34	32	+2	83	
9	Tarbes	34	12	10	12	45	41	+4	80	
10	Mont-de-Marsan	34	11	13	10	39	35	+4	80	
11	Agde (R)	34	11	11	12	38	35	+3	78	Relegation to 2012–13 Championnat de France amateur 2
12	Marseille Consolat	34	10	13	11	35	50	−15	76 (Note: Marseille Consolat was docked one point.)	
13	Pau	34	10	12	12	34	35	−1	76	
14	Marignane	34	11	8	15	40	53	−13	75	
15	Béziers	34	10	10	14	39	50	−11	74	
16	Le Pontet	34	9	9	16	46	57	−11	70	
17	Albi (R)	34	8	7	19	34	51	−17	65	Relegation to 2012–13 Championnat de France amateur 2
18	Gap (R)	34	1	7	26	22	71	−49	44	Relegation to 2012–13 Championnat de France amateur 2

Updated to match(es) played on 2 June 2012. Source: French Football Federation
Rules for classification: 1) points; 2) goal difference; 3) number of goals scored.
(P) Promoted; (R) Relegated

==== Results ====
Home \ Away	AGD	ALB	BEZ	BOR	CAN	CLM	GAP	HYR	LPT	MAR	MSC	MON	MDM	PAU	ROD	SET	TRB	UZE
Agde		1–0	2–2	3–0	0–0	1–1	3–1	2–0	2–2	2–3	0–1	1–2	2–0	0–0	0–0	0–0	1–0	2–1
Albi	1–0		0–1	1–2	1–2	1–0	3–0	0–0	4–1	3–3	3–2	3–4	0–0	1–2	1–3	2–1	2–0	1–3
Béziers	1–1	2–0		0–1	4–2	0–0	2–2	2–1	1–0	0–2	0–2	0–4	2–3	1–1	1–2	2–1	3–1	0–1
Bordeaux Reserves	0–1	3–1	2–0		0–2	0–0	0–0	3–0	3–1	2–0	0–0	1–0	1–4	0–1	2–0	0–0	2–0	0–2
Cannes	3–1	2–0	1–1	2–1		1–1	3–1	4–0	1–2	1–1	1–1	3–0	1–1	3–0	0–3	3–1	1–1	2–2
Colomiers	2–2	1–0	2–1	3–1	2–3		2–1	1–1	5–1	1–1	3–0	2–3	0–0	1–0	2–2	3–1	1–3	0–0
Gap	0–4	1–1	1–1	0–1	0–2	0–0		1–2	0–2	2–1	0–1	1–4	1–2	1–1	0–1	1–2	0–1	1–2
Hyères	2–2	1–0	1–1	2–0	2–1	1–1	1–0		1–1	1–0	1–1	4–1	1–0	2–0	2–0	0–0	1–0	0–0
Le Pontet	0–1	2–2	4–2	0–2	0–1	2–0	4–3	1–1		1–2	3–1	2–3	0–1	0–0	1–1	1–0	1–2	1–1
Marignane	2–1	2–1	2–3	0–1	0–0	0–0	2–1	0–1	2–2		1–0	3–0	0–0	3–1	0–2	0–2	2–1	2–1
Marseille Consolat	1–0	2–1	2–3	0–0	0–3	0–0	1–0	2–2	2–2	2–0		2–2	0–0	1–0	0–4	1–1	4–2	0–0
Monaco Reserves	0–2	0–1	2–0	3–1	0–0	0–1	1–0	4–1	2–3	2–0	5–0		1–0	0–2	1–0	1–1	0–1	4–1
Mont-de-Marsan	1–0	0–0	0–0	1–1	3–2	1–1	3–2	3–1	1–1	2–1	2–2	1–2		2–0	1–2	2–0	1–1	2–3
Pau	2–0	0–0	0–2	0–0	0–1	0–3	4–0	1–4	0–2	5–0	0–0	3–2	1–1		1–0	3–1	3–1	1–1
Rodez	3–0	1–0	2–0	0–2	3–0	1–0	2–0	3–0	1–0	1–0	0–0	0–0	1–0	0–0		1–3	0–0	3–1
Saint-Étienne Reserves	2–1	4–0	1–1	2–1	3–1	0–1	6–0	1–2	3–0	4–0	3–1	4–0	2–0	0–0	3–3		2–0	1–1
Tarbes	0–0	3–0	2–0	1–0	1–0	0–3	0–0	5–0	2–1	3–3	4–0	2–3	2–1	1–1	1–1	2–2		0–1
Uzès Pont du Gard	2–0	2–0	2–0	2–1	3–2	2–0	6–1	2–1	2–0	4–2	1–1	0–0	1–0	1–0	2–0	1–0	1–1	

Updated to match(es) played on 2 June 2012. Source: French Football Federation
Legend: Blue = home team win; Yellow = draw; Red = away team win.

=== Group D ===
Pos	Team	Pld	W	D	L	GF	GA	GD	Pts	Promotion or relegation
1	Carquefou (P)	34	21	8	5	53	24	+29	105	Promotion to 2012–13 Championnat National
2	Vendée Luçon	34	21	8	5	63	38	+25	105	
3	Avranches	34	19	6	9	53	33	+20	97	
4	Plabennec	34	15	11	8	55	41	+14	90	
5	Romorantin	34	16	7	11	58	33	+25	89	
6	Les Herbiers	34	14	9	11	40	40	0	85	
7	Concarneau	34	13	7	14	49	44	+5	80	
8	Mantes	34	13	7	14	45	45	0	79 (Note: Mantes was docked one point.)	
9	Saumur	34	11	10	13	39	43	−4	77	
10	Havre Reserves	34	12	7	15	46	55	−9	77	Championnat de France amateur Playoffs
11	Viry-Châtillon	34	12	5	17	43	45	−2	75	
12	Le Mans Reserves	34	10	11	13	41	47	−6	75	
13	Vendée Fontenay	34	10	9	15	29	42	−13	73	
14	Pacy Vallée-d'Eure (D, R)	34	10	9	15	34	50	−16	73	Excluded
15	Caen Reserves	34	9	11	14	34	42	−8	72	
16	Pontivy	34	8	13	13	29	37	−8	71	
17	Lorient Reserves (R)	34	9	9	16	38	55	−17	70	Relegation to 2012–13 Championnat de France amateur 2
18	La Vitréenne (R)	34	5	9	20	24	60	−36	57 (Note: La Vitréenne was docked one point.)	Relegation to 2012–13 Championnat de France amateur 2

Updated to match(es) played on 2 June 2012. Source: French Football Federation
Rules for classification: 1) points; 2) goal difference; 3) number of goals scored.
(D) Disqualified; (P) Promoted; (R) Relegated

==== Results ====
Home \ Away	AVR	CAE	CQF	CCN	VIT	HACR	LMN	LHB	LOR	MNT	PVE	PLA	PON	RMA	SMR	VFF	VLF	VYC
Avranches		0–3	1–0	0–1	1–0	5–0	3–1	1–1	5–2	2–0	1–0	2–0	1–1	1–0	0–2	3–1	1–0	2–1
Caen Reserves	1–1		0–0	1–1	1–0	1–3	3–0	3–0	3–0	1–2	1–0	3–1	2–0	1–3	0–0	0–2	0–0	1–2
Carquefou	2–1	3–0		3–2	2–0	1–0	1–1	0–1	1–0	1–1	4–0	3–2	3–1	2–3	1–0	2–0	3–1	1–0
Concarneau	4–1	2–2	0–0		4–1	5–0	4–1	1–2	0–1	1–0	0–1	0–2	3–0	0–3	0–2	2–0	1–2	4–1
La Vitréenne	0–1	0–0	0–4	2–4		3–1	1–3	2–2	1–1	1–2	0–1	0–2	0–0	1–0	1–1	3–1	1–3	0–4
Havre Reserves	0–1	0–0	0–1	1–2	0–0		2–2	1–0	4–0	2–2	1–3	2–2	2–1	2–1	1–1	2–1	1–3	3–0
Le Mans Reserves	0–2	0–0	0–0	1–1	1–0	0–1		2–1	1–1	1–1	2–2	4–1	2–0	1–0	2–3	0–1	2–2	2–1
Les Herbiers	2–1	0–0	1–2	1–0	0–0	1–2	1–0		1–0	3–1	3–1	1–0	1–1	2–4	1–1	0–0	1–2	2–0
Lorient Reserves	0–1	2–0	2–3	1–0	2–2	1–2	3–2	0–3		0–1	3–1	1–1	0–0	1–1	3–2	1–1	2–1	2–1
Mantes	0–1	3–0	1–2	0–0	1–2	2–0	1–0	0–1	1–0		2–2	0–0	1–4	0–3	0–3	4–0	1–1	1–0
Pacy Vallée-d'Eure	1–1	2–1	0–2	2–0	0–0	0–3	1–0	1–1	2–1	3–5		1–2	1–1	0–0	4–0	2–2	0–4	1–0
Plabennec	2–1	1–3	2–0	3–1	3–0	5–3	5–1	3–1	3–1	2–1	0–0		1–2	1–1	1–1	0–0	1–1	1–0
Pontivy	0–0	3–0	1–3	1–1	2–0	2–1	1–2	1–1	1–1	1–0	0–1	1–2		1–0	0–0	2–0	0–2	0–3
Romorantin	4–3	4–1	0–0	0–0	3–0	2–1	1–0	5–0	2–1	0–1	3–1	0–1	0–0		2–1	1–2	2–4	0–0
Saumur	0–4	1–1	1–2	1–2	0–0	2–2	0–0	0–1	2–3	1–3	1–0	2–1	0–0	3–2		3–0	0–2	0–3
Vendée Fontenay	0–3	3–0	0–0	0–1	1–0	2–0	0–1	1–2	1–1	4–3	2–0	2–2	0–0	1–0	0–1		0–2	1–2
Vendée Luçon	2–0	1–0	1–0	4–3	6–2	3–1	1–1	2–1	2–0	2–1	2–0	0–0	2–1	0–7	1–2	0–0		3–2
Viry-Châtillon	2–2	2–1	0–0	1–2	1–2	0–2	5–2	2–1	3–1	1–3	1–0	2–2	1–0	0–1	1–0	0–1	1–1	

Updated to match(es) played on 2 June 2012. Source: French Football Federation
Legend: Blue = home team win; Yellow = draw; Red = away team win.

== Top goalscorers ==
Group A
Rank	Scorer	Club	Goals
1	(France) Stéphane Boulila	Aubervilliers	14
2	(France) Madimoussa Traoré	CA Bastia	12
3	(France) Mickaël Despois	AC Amiens	11
3	(France) Romain Pastorelli	CA Bastia	11
5	(France) Arnaud Despres	Avion	9
6	(France) Gaëtan Fallempin	Valenciennes B	8
7	(France) Hakeem Achour	Ivry	7
7	(France) Simon Dia	Valenciennes B	7
7	(France) Oumarou Diaby	Poissy	7
7	(France) Ben Sangaré	Ivry	7
Last updated: 21 March 2012; Source: Official Goalscorers' Standings (Group A)

Group B
Rank	Scorer	Club	Goals
1	(France) Yohan Di Tommaso	Lyon Duchère	13
2	(France) Stéphane Calcé	Valence	11
2	(France) Julio Tavares	Bourg-Péronnas	11
4	(Togo) Tagba Mini Balogou	Mulhouse	9
4	(Guinea) Alhassane Keita	Metz B	9
6	(Portugal) Bruno Barreto	Lyon Duchère	8
6	(France) Hakim Menaï	Amnéville	8
8	(Bosnia and Herzegovina) Mevludin Cuskić	Belfort	7
8	(France) Yohan Dufour	Raon-l'Étape	7
8	(France) Zac Gbadamassi	Yzeure	7
Last updated: 18 March 2012; Source: Official Goalscorers' Standings (Group B)

Group C
Rank	Scorer	Club	Goals
1	(France) Samir Benmeziane	Le Pontet	10
1	(France) Jérémy Bru	Marignane	10
1	(France) Grégory Firquet	Hyères	10
4	(France) Abdelilah Aabiza	Adge	9
4	(France) Kévin Goba	Uzès	9
6	(Argentina) Emiliano Sala	Bordeaux	8
7	(France) Pierre Aristouy	Mont-de-Marsan	7
7	(France) Khalid Boutaib	Uzès	7
7	(France) Stéphane Chmielinski	Cannes	7
7	(France) Romain Seguret	Tarbes	7
Last updated: 21 March 2012; Source: Official Goalscorers' Standings (Group C)

Group D
Rank	Scorer	Club	Goals
1	(France) Steven Papin	Plabennec	16
2	(Republic of the Congo) Charles Mayélé Kiaku	Pacy Vallée-d'Eure	12
3	(France) Julien Girard	Romorantin	11
4	(France) Walid Aïchour	Viry-Châtillon	10
5	(France) Damien Mayenga	Pacy Vallée-d'Eure	9
5	(Ivory Coast) Christopher Mayulu	Carquefou	9
7	(France) Marc Labat	Concarneau	8
7	(France) Riyad Mahrez	Le Havre B	8
9	(France) Pierrick Mornet	Vendée Fontenay	7
9	(France) Anthony Robić	Romorantin	7
Last updated: 6 April 2012; Source: Official Goalscorers' Standings (Group D)
