= Stéphane Trévisan =

French footballer (born 1974)

Personal information
- Date of birth: 27 March 1974 (age 52)
- Place of birth: Toulouse, France
- Height: 1.82 m (6 ft 0 in)
- Position: Goalkeeper

Senior career*
Years	Team	Apps	(Gls)
1995–1996	Toulouse Fontaines		
1996–1999	Guingamp	20	(0)
1999–2001	Marseille	31	(0)
2001–2006	Ajaccio	117	(0)
2006–2007	Sedan	9	(0)
2007–2010	Guingamp	44	(0)
Total		221	(0)
- * Club domestic league appearances and goals

Stéphane Trévisan (born 27 March 1974) is a French former professional footballer who played as a goalkeeper. During his career, which began in 1995 at Toulouse Fontaines and concluded in 2010 after a three-year spell with Guingamp. During his career, he made over 200 league appearances.

== Career ==
=== Club career ===
Trévisan started his professional career at Guingamp, where he was their number two goalkeeper, first behind Angelo Hugues then behind Ronald Thomas.

After three years, he decided to go to Marseille, where in his first year he would again be number two behind Stéphane Porato, but would still play two Champions League matches. His good performances when he did get into the starting eleven convinced his manager to make him the number one goalkeeper the following year, Porato having returned to Monaco. Trévisan's second season with Marseille, his first as a regular starter, swiftly turned into a nightmare for him, as he made error after mistake as Marseille battled relegation. Ultimately, Trévisan decided to give up his spot in the team and to let young keeper Damien Gregorini play the final nine games of the season.

The following summer, he left the club to Ligue 2 side Ajaccio. For his first year there, he helped the club win the league and achieve promotion to Ligue 1, and was named Ligue 2 Goalkeeper of the Year. He finally got to play two complete seasons in Ligue 1 (38 and 32 games respectively), but found himself number two again, and again behind Stéphane Porato for the following two years.

This led him to sign for Sedan, where he only got to play nine games, as, despite his excellent performances, he could never displace local icon Patrick Regnault.

Angry at this treatment he judged unfair, Trévisan left Sedan after just one year to go back to his first club, Guingamp. After a difficult first year where he only got to play 12 games, his second season was much more rewarding as he started almost every league match, and also won the Coupe de France (although Guillaume Gauclin was the starting goalkeeper throughout this competition).

In June 2010, after Guingamp was relegated to the third French league, Trévisan's contract expired and he retired.

== Career statistics ==
Appearances and goals by club, season and competition
Club	Season	League			National cup		League cup		Europe		Other		Total	
Club	Season	Division	Apps	Goals	Apps	Goals	Apps	Goals	Apps	Goals	Apps	Goals	Apps	Goals
Guingamp	1995–96	Division 1	0	0	0	0	0	0	—		—		0	0
Guingamp	1996–97	Division 1	9	0	0	0	1	0	0	0	—		10	0
Guingamp	1997–98	Division 1	0	0	0	0	0	0	—		—		0	0
Guingamp	1998–99	Division 2	11	0	1	0	0	0	—		—		12	0
Guingamp	Total		20	0	1	0	1	0	0	0	—		22	0
Marseille	1999–2000	Division 1	6	0	2	0	0	0	2	0	—		10	0
Marseille	2000–01	Division 1	25	0	1	0	1	0	—		—		27	0
Marseille	Total		31	0	3	0	1	0	2	0	—		37	0
Ajaccio	2001–02	Division 2	37	0	2	0	1	0	—		—		40	0
Ajaccio	2002–03	Ligue 1	32	0	2	0	0	0	—		—		34	0
Ajaccio	2003–04	Ligue 1	38	0	0	0	1	0	—		—		39	0
Ajaccio	2004–05	Ligue 1	3	0	0	0	0	0	—		—		3	0
Ajaccio	2005–06	Ligue 1	7	0	2	0	2	0	—		—		11	0
Ajaccio	Total		117	0	6	0	4	0	—		—		127	0
Al Sadd	2006–07	Ligue 1	9	0	3	0	0	0	—				12	0
Guingamp	2007–08	Ligue 2	12	0	0	0	0	0	—		—		12	0
Guingamp	2008–09	Ligue 2	33	0	0	0	0	0	—		—		33	2
Guingamp	2009–10	Ligue 2	12	0	3	0	2	0	1	0	1	0	19	0
Guingamp	Total		57	0	3	0	2	0	1	0	1	0	64	0
Career total			234	0	16	0	8	0	3	0	1	0	262	0

== Honours ==
Ajaccio

- Division 2: 2002

Guingamp

- Coupe de France: 2009
