= Brisset =

Brisset is a surname. Notable people with the surname include:

- Jean-Pierre Brisset (1837–1919), French writer
- Mickaël Brisset (born 1985), French professional football player
