= Xavier Bécas =

French footballer (born 1979)

Personal information
- Date of birth: 31 May 1979 (age 47)
- Place of birth: Tarbes, France
- Height: 1.71 m (5 ft 7 1/2 in)
- Position: Midfielder

Senior career*
Years	Team	Apps	(Gls)
1997–2000	Pau FC		
2000–2001	Sedan	5	(0)
2001–2002	AC Ajaccio	55	(8)
2003	Metz	13	(0)
2003–2004	FC Gueugnon	9	(0)
2004–2005	Pau FC		
2005–2006	AC Ajaccio	1	(0)
2006–2007	Istres	6	(0)
2007–2008	Tarbes Pyrénées		
2009–2013	Pau FC	111	(9)
- * Club domestic league appearances and goals as of 22 December 2020

Xavier Bécas (born 31 May 1979) is a French professional football player.

He played on the professional level in Ligue 1 for CS Sedan Ardennes and AC Ajaccio and in Ligue 2 for AC Ajaccio, FC Metz, FC Gueugnon and FC Istres.

A native of Tarbes, Bécas began playing football with local side Tarbes Pyrénées Football before making his Ligue 1 debut with Sedan. In the summer of 2001, Bécas joined Ajaccio where he would lead the club with eight goals as Ajaccio became 2001–02 French Division 2 champions. However, after just six months in Ligue 1, Bécas was dropped from the senior squad and never would play at that level again.
