= Mahamat Saleh =

Chadian footballer (born 1980)

Personal information
- Date of birth: 6 June 1980 (age 46)
- Place of birth: N'Djamena, Chad
- Height: 1.80 m (5 ft 11 in)
- Position: Midfielder

Senior career*
Years	Team	Apps	(Gls)
2002–2003	Lusitanos Saint-Maur		
2003–2008	Angers B	1	(0)
2005–2009	Angers	5	(1)
2009–2012	US Albi	85	(10)
2012–2013	Poitiers	13	(1)

International career
2003	Chad		
- * Club domestic league appearances and goals

Mahamat Saleh (born 6 June 1980) is a Chadian former professional footballer who played as a midfielder.

== Career ==
Saleh was born in N'Djamena, Chad. Saleh played on the professional level in Ligue 2 for Angers SCO.
