= Frédéric Marques =

French footballer (born 1985)

Personal information
- Full name: Frédéric Marques
- Date of birth: 5 June 1985 (age 41)
- Place of birth: Thionville, France
- Height: 1.75 m (5 ft 9 in)
- Position: Striker

Team information
- Current team: Schifflange

Youth career
- 1992–1997: RC Florange
- 1997–2004: ES Florange

Senior career*
Years	Team	Apps	(Gls)
2004–2006	ES Florange		
2006–2010	Amnéville		
2010–2012	Créteil	60	(15)
2012–2014	Colmar	62	(17)
2014–2015	Strasbourg	15	(3)
2015	Paris FC	10	(0)
2015–2016	Dudelange	16	(1)
2016–2017	SAS Épinal	13	(1)
2017–	Swift Hesperange	2	(0)
- * Club domestic league appearances and goals as of 10 September 2017

Frédéric Marques (born 5 June 1985) is a French footballer who plays for FC Schifflange 95 as a striker.

== Career ==
Marques was born in Thionville. He joined Créteil in 2010 after a successful 2009–10 campaign with Championnat de France amateur club CSO Amnéville in which he scored 27 goals in 31 appearances.

Marques began his career in Florange, a commune in the Moselle department, playing for local club RC Florange. He remained with the club following its merger with another local club ES Florange and made his debut with the club in 2004, while the club was playing in the Promotion d'Honneur of the Ligue de Lorraine, the eighth division of French football. Marques spent another season at the club before departing for Amnéville in 2006. Prior to joining Amnéville, Marques had an unsuccessful trial with professional club FC Metz. At Amnéville, Marques helped the team reach the Championnat de France amateur and, during the 2009–10 season, scored 27 goals in 31 appearances. Marques' play led to interest from FC Lorient, however, the club preferred he play on their reserve team and not the first team. He also drew interest from Laval, Troyes, and Strasbourg, among others. On 17 June 2010, Marques signed a contract with third division club Créteil.
