= Grégory Ursule =

French footballer (born 1977)

Personal information
- Date of birth: 14 January 1977 (age 49)
- Place of birth: Rodez, France
- Height: 1.78 m (5 ft 10 in)
- Position: Midfielder

Team information
- Current team: Rodez AF

Senior career*
Years	Team	Apps	(Gls)
1993–1995	Rodez AF		
1995–1998	Bordeaux (B team)		
1998–1999	Rennes (B team)		
1999–2004	AC Ajaccio	80	(0)
2002–2003	→ FC Gueugnon (loan)	17	(0)
2003–2004	→ FC Gueugnon (loan)	16	(0)
2004–2011	Rodez AF	196	(4)
- * Club domestic league appearances and goals as of 14:33, 20 November 2009 (UTC)

Grégory Ursule (born 14 January 1977) was a French professional football player. He last played in the Championnat National for Rodez AF.

== Career ==
Ursule graduated from FC Girondins de Bordeaux's youth system, although he never played in a competitive match for the club's senior side.

He played on the professional level in Ligue 1 for AC Ajaccio and in Ligue 2 for AC Ajaccio and FC Gueugnon. He retired from professional football in 2011.
