= Nicolas Plestan =

French footballer (born 1981)

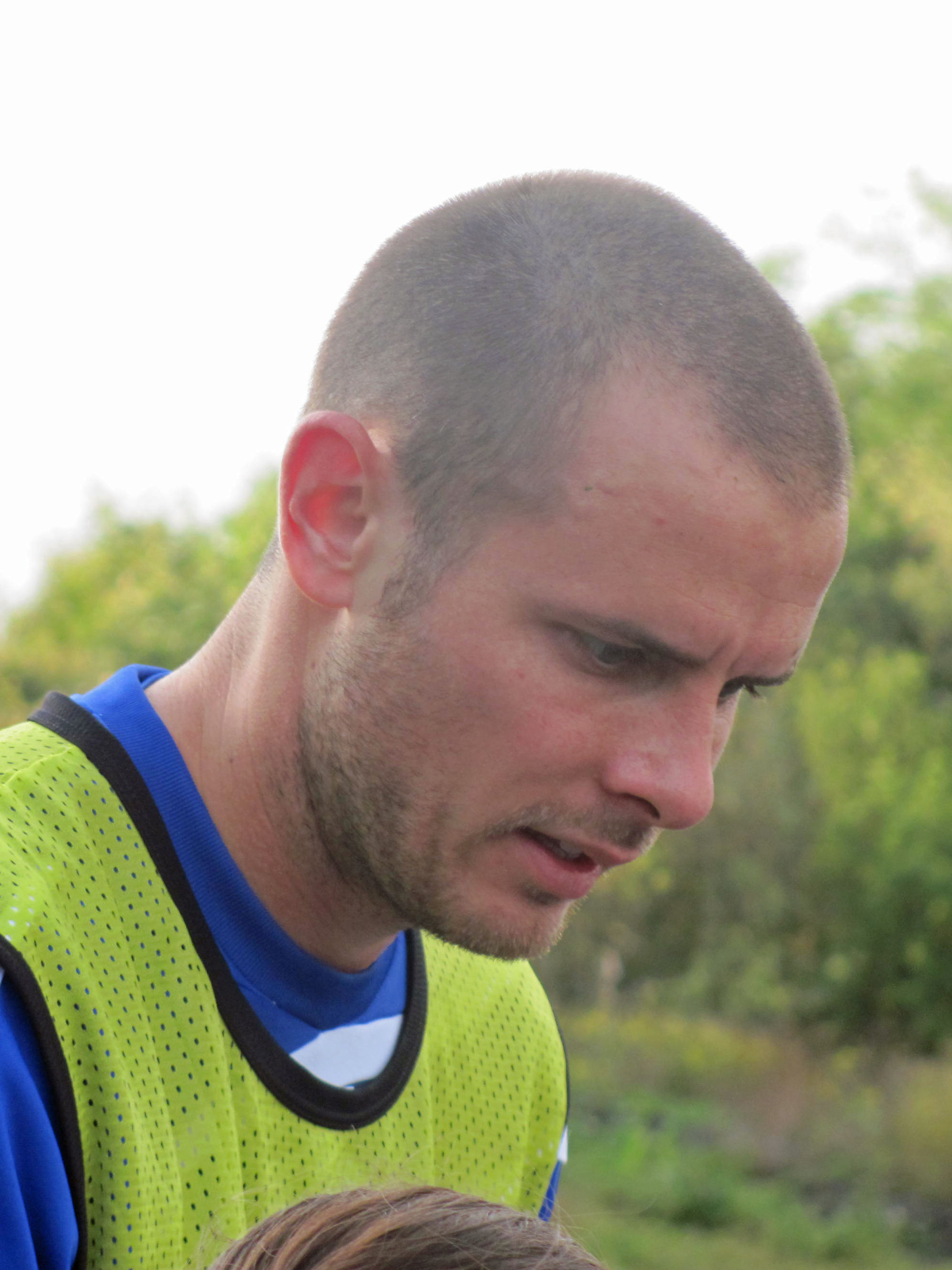

Personal information
- Full name: Nicolas Plestan
- Date of birth: 2 June 1981 (age 45)
- Place of birth: Nice, France
- Height: 1.84 m (6 ft 0 in)
- Position: Defender

Youth career
- 1997–2001: Monaco

Senior career*
| Years | Team | Apps | (Gls) |
| 2001–2003 | Monaco | 0 | (0) |
| 2001 | → Ajaccio (loan) | 0 | (0) |
| 2003–2010 | Lille | 109 | (3) |
| 2010–2011 | Schalke 04 | 3 | (0) |
- * Club domestic league appearances and goals

Nicolas Plestan (born 2 June 1981) is a former French footballer who played as a defender.

== Honours ==
Lille

- UEFA Intertoto Cup: 2004

Schalke 04

- DFB-Pokal: 2010–11
