= Julien Perrin =

French footballer (born 1985)

Personal information
- Date of birth: March 19, 1985 (age 41)
- Place of birth: Lyon, France
- Height: 1.84 m (6 ft 1/2 in)
- Position: Striker

Team information
- Current team: RC Strasbourg

Senior career*
Years	Team	Apps	(Gls)
2003–2004	Lyon (B team)		
2004–2005	Saint-Étienne	1	(0)
2005–2008	AS Cannes	58	(18)
2008–2009	Croix-de-Savoie	28	(5)
2009–2012	Besançon RC	111	(54)
2012–	RC Strasbourg	43	(13)
- * Club domestic league appearances and goals as of 15:41, 23 November 2009 (UTC)

Julien Perrin (born March 19, 1985, in Lyon) is a French professional footballer. He last played for Villefranche FC in the French fourth tier in the 2016/2017 season.

Perrin played one match at the professional level in Ligue 1 for AS Saint-Étienne.
