= Sophiane Baghdad =

French footballer (born 1980)

Personal information
- Full name: Sophiane Baghdad
- Date of birth: 10 September 1980 (age 46)
- Place of birth: Monaco
- Height: 1.84 m (6 ft 0 in)
- Position: Midfielder

Senior career*
Years	Team	Apps	(Gls)
1998–2000	Monaco B	30	(0)
2000–2002	Beauvais	1	(0)
2002–2003	Sedan	3	(0)
2004–2007	Charleroi-Marchienne	70	(13)
2007–2008	OH Leuven	26	(2)
2008–2010	Beveren	33	(1)
2010–2011	Union SG	8	(0)
- * Club domestic league appearances and goals

Sophiane Baghdad (born 10 September 1980) is a French former professional footballer who played as a midfielder.

== Personal life ==
Born in Monaco, he holds both Algerian and French nationalities. He acquired French nationality by naturalization on 19 December 2000.
