= Christophe Destruhaut =

French footballer (born 1973)

Personal information
- Date of birth: January 24, 1973 (age 53)
- Place of birth: Mont-de-Marsan, France
- Height: 1.90 m (6 ft 3 in)
- Position: Defender

Senior career*
Years	Team	Apps	(Gls)
1988–1995	Toulouse FC (B team)		
1995–1996	Blagnac FC		
1996–2000	Gazélec Ajaccio		
2000–2004	AC Ajaccio	57	(1)
2005	Le Havre AC	5	(0)
- * Club domestic league appearances and goals

Christophe Destruhaut (born January 24, 1973) is a retired French professional football player.
