= El-Hadji Arona Niang =

Senegalese footballer

Personal information
- Date of birth: August 13, 1985 (age 41)
- Place of birth: Dakar, Senegal
- Height: 1.77 m (5 ft 9 1/2 in)
- Position: Striker

Team information
- Current team: Balma SC

Senior career*
Years	Team	Apps	(Gls)
2004–2008	Reims B	?	(?)
2007–2008	Reims	2	(1)
2008–2010	US Albi	59	(20)
2010–2012	Pau	38	(15)
2012	SC Feignes	1	(0)
2012–2015	US Albi	53	(19)
2015–2016	Toulouse Rodéo	29	(8)
2016–2017	US Albi	15	(4)
2017–2019	Balma SC	0	(0)
2019-	Asptt chalons		
- * Club domestic league appearances and goals as of 21:23, 20 November 2009 (UTC)

El-Hadji Arona Niang (born August 13, 1985 in Dakar) is a Senegalese professional football player. Currently, he plays in the Championnat de France amateur for Balma SC.

He played on the professional level in Ligue 2 for Stade Reims.
