= Cyril Granon =

French footballer and coach (born 1972)

Personal information
- Date of birth: February 21, 1972 (age 54)
- Place of birth: Aix-en-Provence, France
- Height: 1.71 m (5 ft 7 1/2 in)
- Position: Midfielder

Senior career*
Years	Team	Apps	(Gls)
1990–1992	Monaco	1	(0)
1992–1993	→ Lorient (loan)	34	(7)
1993–1994	Monaco	1	(0)
1994–1996	Mulhouse		
1996–1997	Saint-Denis-Saint-Leu		
1997–2004	Ajaccio	210	(18)
2004–2006	Racing Ferrol	66	(10)
2007–2008	AS Aix-en-Provence		

Managerial career
- 2007–2008: AS Aix-en-Provence
- * Club domestic league appearances and goals

Cyril Granon (born February 21, 1972) is a French professional football coach and a former player.

Granon captained the AC Ajaccio side that were Division 2 champions in 2002.
