= Fousseyni Cissé =

French footballer (born 1989)

Personal information
- Full name: Fousseyni Cissé
- Date of birth: 17 July 1989 (age 37)
- Place of birth: Paris, France
- Height: 1.97 m (6 ft 5 1/2 in)
- Position: Striker

Youth career
- 1998–2006: Les Lilas
- 2006–2007: Olympique Noisy-le-Sec
- 2007–2009: Le Mans

Senior career*
| Years | Team | Apps | (Gls) |
| 2009–2013 | Le Mans | 85 | (10) |
| 2013–2015 | FC Sion | 9 | (0) |
| 2015 | → Arles (loan) | 14 | (3) |
| 2018–2019 | Sant Julià | 25 | (6) |

International career
| 2009 | France U20 | 2 | (1) |
- * Club domestic league appearances and goals as of 19 May 2019

Fousseyni Cissé (born 17 July 1989) is a French professional football player of Senegalese and Chadian descent. He also holds Senegalese citizenship and represented Senegal at junior levels before switching to playing for France.

== Early life ==
Cisse's father is from Senegal and his mother was born in Chad.

== Club career ==
Before joining Le Mans, Cissé played as a youth for Olympique Noisy-le-Sec.

He made his professional debut for Le Mans on October 17, 2009 in a Ligue 1 game against Boulogne.
