= Gaël Sanz =

French footballer (born 1977)

Personal information
- Full name: Gaël Sanz
- Date of birth: 1 May 1977 (age 49)
- Place of birth: Charleville-Mézières, France
- Height: 1.83 m (6 ft 0 in)
- Position: Defender

Senior career*
Years	Team	Apps	(Gls)
1995–1999	Lille OSC	44	(0)
1999–2002	AS Beauvais	100	(2)
2002–2011	Troyes AC	129	(6)
Total		273	(8)
- * Club domestic league appearances and goals

Gaël Sanz (born 1 May 1977) is a French former professional footballer who played as a defender.

He joined Ligue 1 side Troyes AC in the summer of 2002 from AS Beauvais and spent nine seasons playing for the club.
