= Hakeem Achour =

French footballer (born 1989)

Personal information
- Date of birth: 31 May 1989 (age 37)
- Place of birth: Le Blanc-Mesnil, France
- Height: 1.80 m (5 ft 11 in)
- Positions: Midfielder; winger; forward

Team information
- Current team: Sainte-Geneviève

Senior career*
Years	Team	Apps	(Gls)
2008–2009	Villemomble	34	(3)
2009–2010	Paris Saint-Germain II	0	(0)
2010–2012	Ivry	37	(14)
2012–2014	Dijon	3	(0)
2012–2014	Dijon II	11	(0)
2014–2015	Fréjus St-Raphaël	4	(0)
2015–2016	Saoura	5	(0)
2016–2018	Viry Châtillon	56	(12)
2018–2019	Drancy	11	(0)
2019–2020	FC 93	1	(0)
2020–	Sainte-Geneviève	42	(6)
- * Club domestic league appearances and goals as of 7 December 2024

Hakeem Achour (born 31 May 1989) is a French footballer who plays for Championnat National 3 club Sainte-Geneviève.
