= Jérôme Lempereur =

French footballer (born 1973)

Personal information
- Full name: Jérôme Lempereur
- Date of birth: November 3, 1973 (age 52)
- Place of birth: Beauvais, France
- Height: 1.81 m (5 ft 11 1/2 in)
- Position: Striker

Senior career*
Years	Team	Apps	(Gls)
1994–1997	Beauvais	99	(40)
1997–1998	Louhans-Cuiseaux	16	(9)
1998–2001	Auxerre B	16	(12)
1998–1999	→ Nîmes (loan)	20	(7)
1999–2000	→ Chamois Niortais (loan)	28	(9)
2001	Gent	16	(1)
2001–2002	Beauvais	15	(1)
2002–2004	Gueugnon	56	(12)
2004–2006	Sannois-Saint-Gratien	70	(22)
2006–2007	Rouen	15	(1)
- * Club domestic league appearances and goals

Jérôme Lempereur (born November 3, 1973, in Beauvais, France) is a retired professional footballer. He played as a striker.
