= 2003–04 AC Ajaccio season =

AC Ajaccio
2003–04 season
- Manager: Dominique Bijotat
- Stadium: Stade François Coty
- Ligue 1: 15th
- Coupe de France: Round of 64
- Coupe de la Ligue: Round of 32
- Top goalscorer: League: Mamadou Bagayoko (8); All: Mamadou Bagayoko (8)
- Average home league attendance: 4,347
- Biggest defeat: Nantes 4–0 Ajaccio; Lyon 4–0 Ajaccio

The 2003–04 AC Ajaccio season was the club's 94th season in existence and the second consecutive season in the second division of French football. In addition to the domestic league, Ajaccio participated in this season's edition of the Coupe de France. The season covered the period from 1 July 2003 to 30 June 2004.

== Competitions ==
=== Overview ===
Competition	First match	Last match	Starting round	Final position	Record							
Competition	First match	Last match	Starting round	Final position	Pld	W	D	L	GF	GA	GD	Win %
Ligue 1	2 August 2003	23 May 2004	Matchday 1	15th	38	10	10	18	33	55	−22	26.32
Coupe de France	4 January 2004		Round of 64	Round of 64	1	0	0	1	0	2	−2	0.00
Coupe de la Ligue	28 November 2003		Round of 32	Round of 32	1	0	0	1	0	2	−2	0.00
Total					40	10	10	20	33	59	−26	25.00

Source: Competitions

=== Ligue 1 ===
==== League table ====
Pos	Team	Pld	W	D	L	GF	GA	GD	Pts
13	Strasbourg	38	10	13	15	43	50	−7	43
14	Metz	38	11	9	18	34	42	−8	42
15	Ajaccio	38	10	10	18	33	55	−22	40
16	Toulouse	38	9	12	17	31	44	−13	39
17	Bastia	38	9	12	17	33	49	−16	39

Source: Ligue 1
Rules for classification: 1) points; 2) goal difference; 3) number of goals scored.

==== Results summary ====
Overall								Home						Away					
Pld	W	D	L	GF	GA	GD	Pts	W	D	L	GF	GA	GD	W	D	L	GF	GA	GD
38	10	10	18	33	55	−22	40	8	5	6	18	17	+1	2	5	12	15	38	−23

Source: Ligue 1

==== Results by round ====
Round	1	2	3	4	5	6	7	8	9	10	11	12	13	14	15	16	17	18	19	20	21	22	23	24	25	26	27	28	29	30	31	32	33	34	35	36	37	38
Ground	A	A	H	A	H	A	H	A	H	A	H	A	H	A	H	A	H	A	H	H	A	H	A	H	A	H	A	H	A	H	A	H	A	H	A	H	A	H
Result	W	W	L	D	L	L	W	L	L	D	D	D	L	L	W	L	L	L	W	W	L	D	L	D	L	W	L	L	L	W	D	D	L	D	D	W	L	W
Position	4	2	7	7	10	14	12	15	16	17	17	16	17	17	15	16	16	17	16	15	15	15	15	16	16	15	15	17	18	16	17	17	18	18	19	17	18	15

Source: Ligue 1
A = Away; H = Home; W = Win; D = Draw; L = Loss

==== Matches ====
2 August 2003 1	Metz	0–1	Ajaccio

9 August 2003 2	Le Mans	0–1	Ajaccio

16 August 2003 3	Ajaccio	1–3	Nantes	Ajaccio
				Stadium: Stade François Coty

23 August 2003 4	Nice	2–2	Ajaccio

31 August 2003 5	Ajaccio	0–1	Marseille	Ajaccio
				Stadium: Stade François Coty

13 September 2003 6	Strasbourg	3–2	Ajaccio

20 September 2003 7	Ajaccio	1–0	Rennes	Ajaccio
				Stadium: Stade François Coty

28 September 2003 8	Bordeaux	1–0	Ajaccio

4 October 2003 9	Ajaccio	2–4	Lyon	Ajaccio
				Stadium: Stade François Coty

18 October 2003 10	Lille	0–0	Ajaccio

25 October 2003 11	Ajaccio	0–0	Paris Saint-Germain	Ajaccio
				Stadium: Stade François Coty

1 November 2003 12	Bastia	1–1	Ajaccio

9 November 2003 13	Ajaccio	0–1	Monaco	Ajaccio
				Stadium: Stade François Coty

22 November 2003 14	Montpellier	3–1	Ajaccio

29 November 2003 15	Ajaccio	2–1	Toulouse	Ajaccio
				Stadium: Stade François Coty

3 December 2003 16	Guingamp	2–0	Ajaccio

6 December 2003 17	Ajaccio	1–2	Auxerre	Ajaccio
				Stadium: Stade François Coty

13 December 2003 18	Sochaux	2–0	Ajaccio

20 December 2003 19	Ajaccio	2–0	Lens	Ajaccio
				Stadium: Stade François Coty

10 January 2004 20	Ajaccio	2–0	Le Mans	Ajaccio
				Stadium: Stade François Coty

17 January 2004 21	Nantes	4–0	Ajaccio

31 January 2004 22	Ajaccio	1–1	Nice	Ajaccio
				Stadium: Stade François Coty

7 February 2004 23	Marseille	2–1	Ajaccio

14 February 2004 24	Ajaccio	0–0	Strasbourg	Ajaccio
				Stadium: Stade François Coty

21 February 2004 25	Rennes	4–1	Ajaccio

29 February 2004 26	Ajaccio	1–0	Bordeaux	Ajaccio
				Stadium: Stade François Coty

5 March 2004 27	Lyon	4–0	Ajaccio

13 March 2004 28	Ajaccio	0–3	Lille	Ajaccio
				Stadium: Stade François Coty

20 March 2004 29	Paris Saint-Germain	1–0	Ajaccio

27 March 2004 30	Ajaccio	1–0	Bastia	Ajaccio
				Stadium: Stade François Coty

2 April 2004 31	Monaco	3–3	Ajaccio

10 April 2004 32	Ajaccio	0–0	Montpellier	Ajaccio
				Stadium: Stade François Coty

24 April 2004 33	Toulouse	3–1	Ajaccio

1 May 2004 34	Ajaccio	0–0	Guingamp	Ajaccio
				Stadium: Stade François Coty

8 May 2004 35	Auxerre	1–1	Ajaccio

12 May 2004 36	Ajaccio	1–0	Sochaux	Ajaccio
				Stadium: Stade François Coty

15 May 2004 37	Lens	2–0	Ajaccio

23 May 2004 38	Ajaccio	3–1	Metz	Ajaccio
				Stadium: Stade François Coty

=== Coupe de France ===
4 January 2004 Round of 64	Ajaccio	0–2	Gueugnon	Ajaccio
				Stadium: Stade François Coty

=== Coupe de la Ligue ===
28 October 2003 Round of 32	Ajaccio	2–2 (1–4 p)	Nice	Ajaccio
	Diomède 3' (pen.); Moracchini 115'		Meslin 60'; Bigné 112'	Stadium: Stade François Coty; Attendance: 4,500; Referee: Laurent Duhamel
