= Tagba Mini Balogou =

Togolese footballer (born 1987)

Mini Balogou
Personal information
- Full name: Mini Tagba Balogou
- Date of birth: December 13, 1987 (age 38)
- Place of birth: Lomé, Togo
- Height: 1.70 m (5 ft 7 in)
- Position: Central midfielder

Team information
- Current team: FC Mulhouse

Youth career
- 2004–2007: Olympique Marseille

Senior career*
| Years | Team | Apps | (Gls) |
| 2005–2006 | Olympique Marseille B | 5 | (0) |
| 2006–2007 | FC Lorient B | 20 | (0) |
| 2007–2009 | SR Colmar | 31 | (7) |
| 2009–2010 | FC Mulhouse | 22 | (6) |
| 2010–2011 | USL Dunkerque | 1 | (0) |
| 2011– | FC Mulhouse | 30 | (12) |

International career
| 2006–2009 | Togo | 2 | (0) |
- * Club domestic league appearances and goals

Mini Tagba Balogou (born December 31, 1987, in Lomé) is a Togolese footballer who currently plays for FC Mulhouse.

== Club career ==
Balogou began his career in the youth side for Olympique Marseille and was here promoted to the second team in summer 2005. After one year with Olympique Marseille B signed his first professional contract with FC Lorient, he played only for the reserve team and signed in summer 2007 with SR Colmar. Balogou played 32 games and scores eight goals for SR Colmar in the Championnat de France amateur 2, before signed after two years on 8 June 2009 for FC Mulhouse. The midfielder joined in summer 2010 from FC Mulhouse of the France Championnat de France amateur 2 to USL Dunkerque.

== International career ==
In the age from eighteen was his first call-up for the Togo on 10 August 2006 against Ghana national football team and played his first match on 12 November 2008. His second match was against Japan.
