= Stade Pierre Brisson =

Stadium in Beauvais, France

Coordinates: 49°25′54″N 2°6′50″E

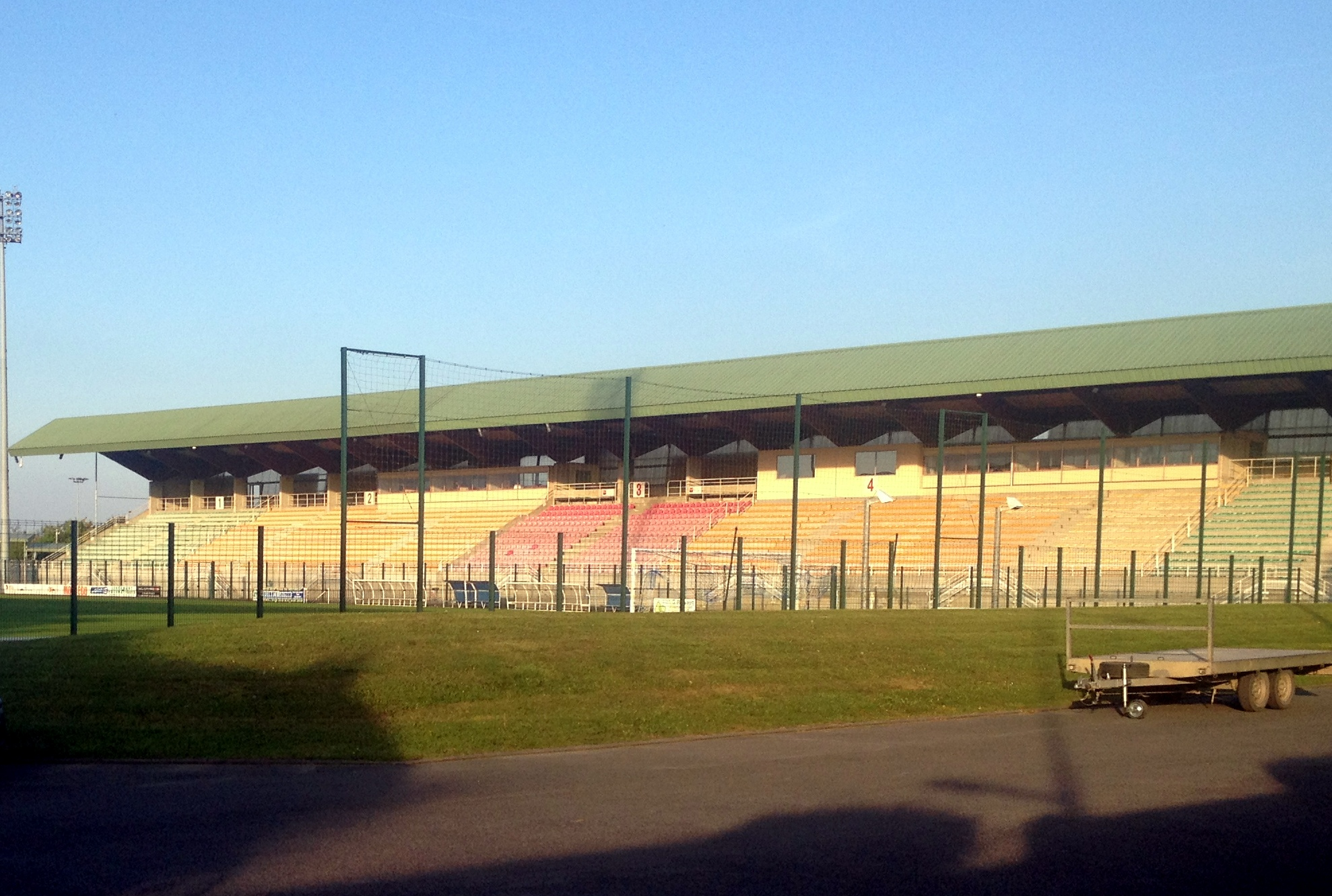
- Interactive map of Stade Pierre Brisson
- Location: Beauvais, France
- Capacity: 10,178
- Surface: AirFibr (hybrid grass)

Tenant
- AS Beauvais Oise

Stade Pierre Brisson is a multi-use stadium in Beauvais, France. It is used mostly for football matches and serves as the home stadium for AS Beauvais Oise. The stadium is able to hold 10,178 spectators.

== Gallery ==
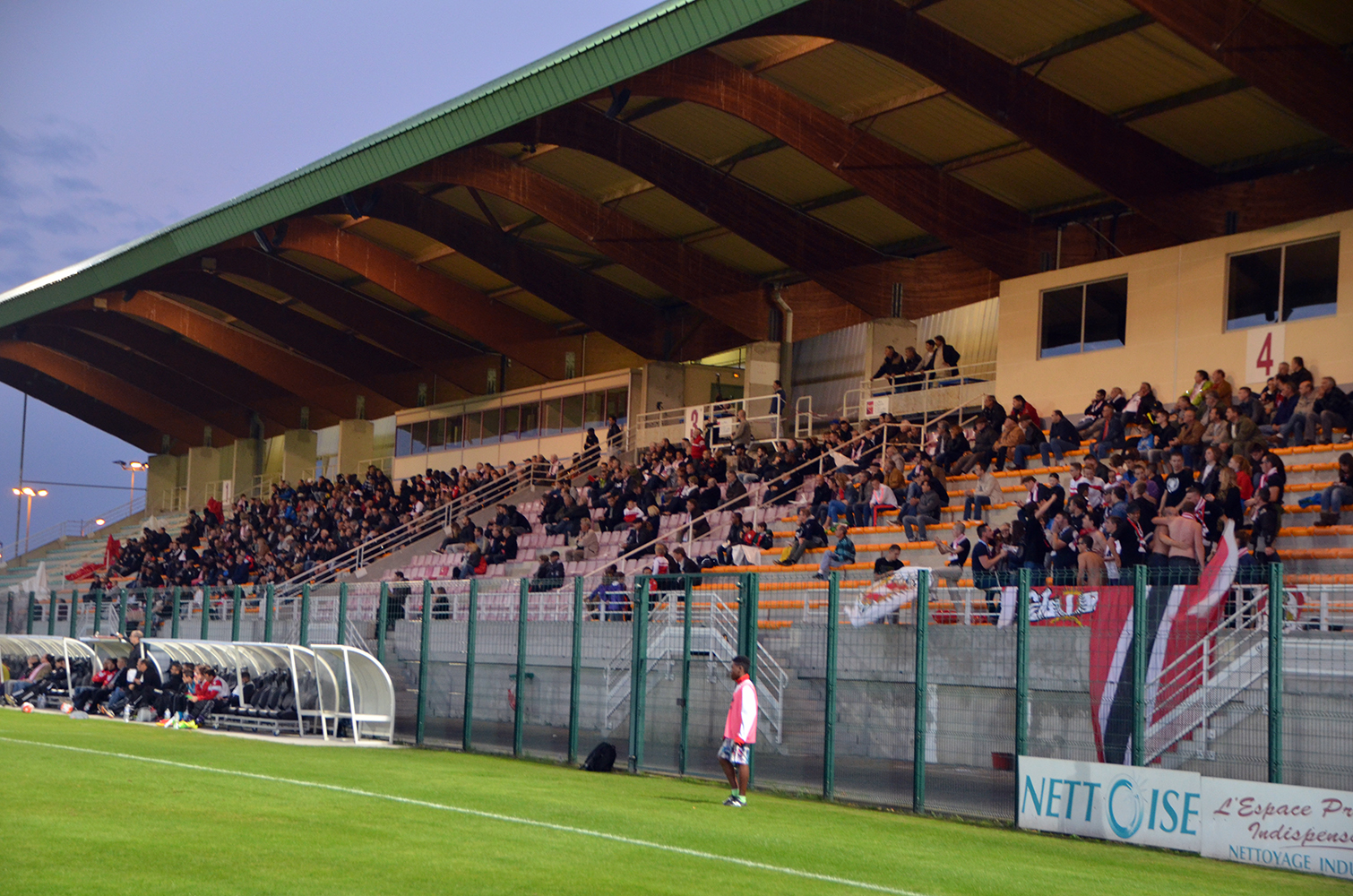

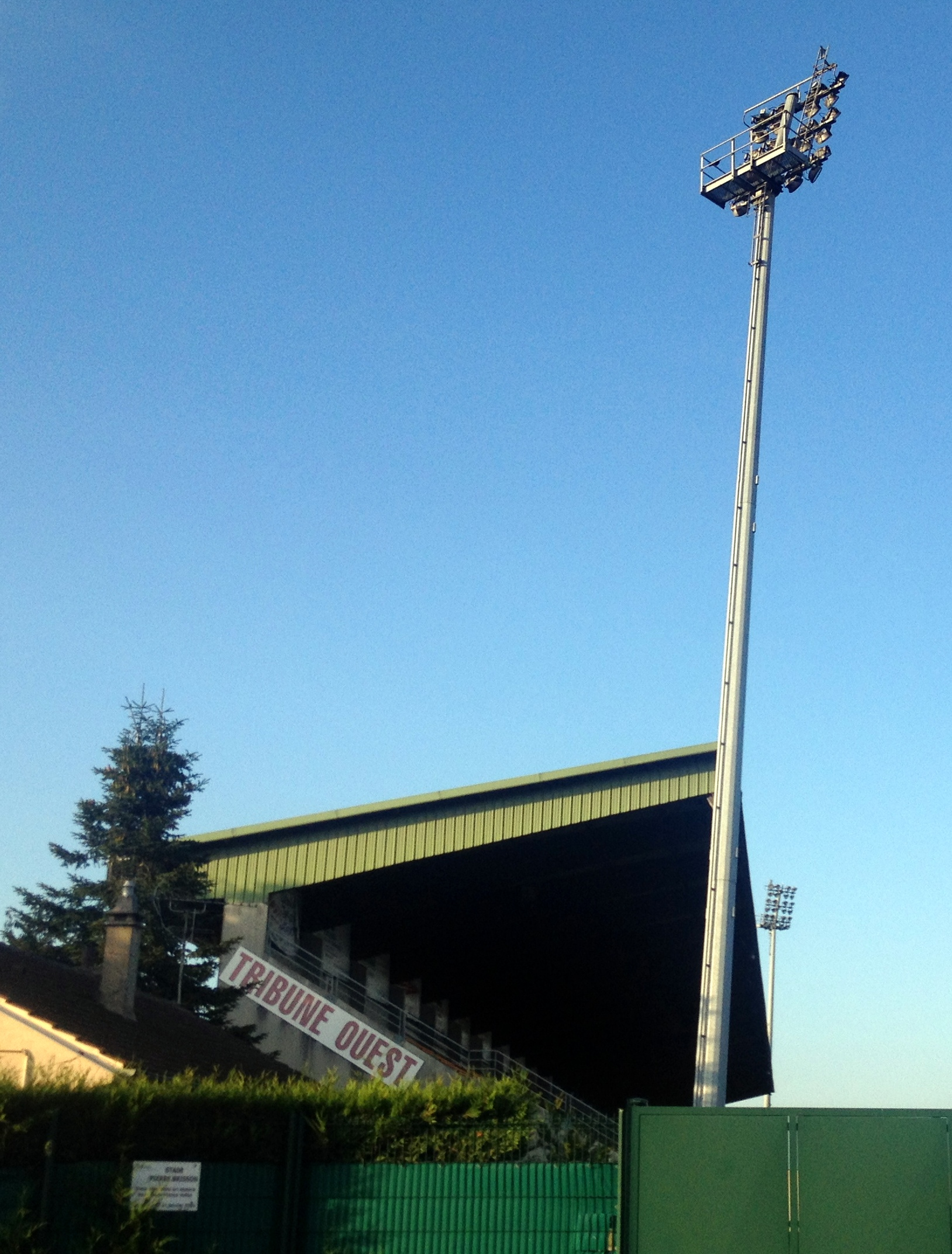

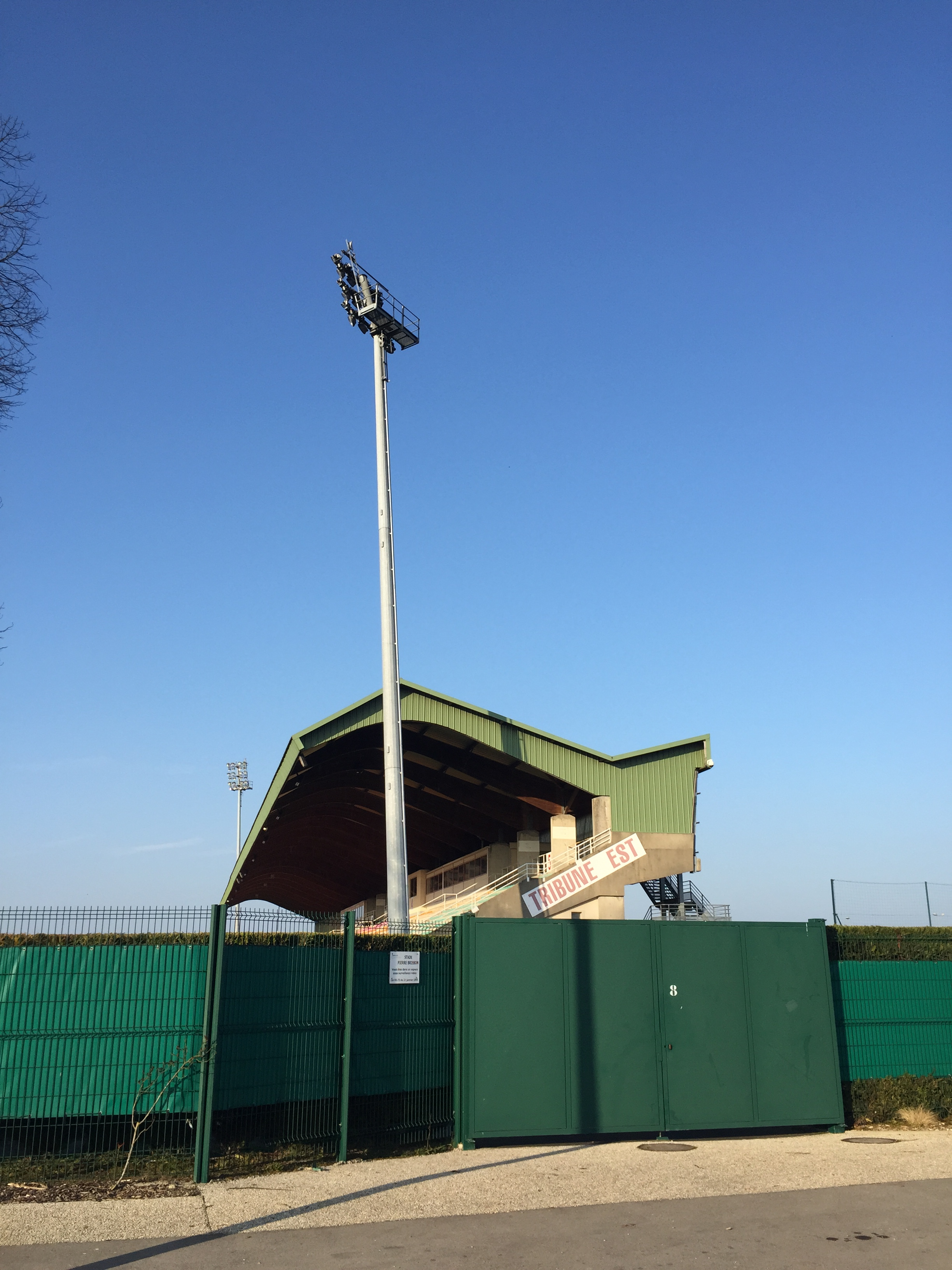

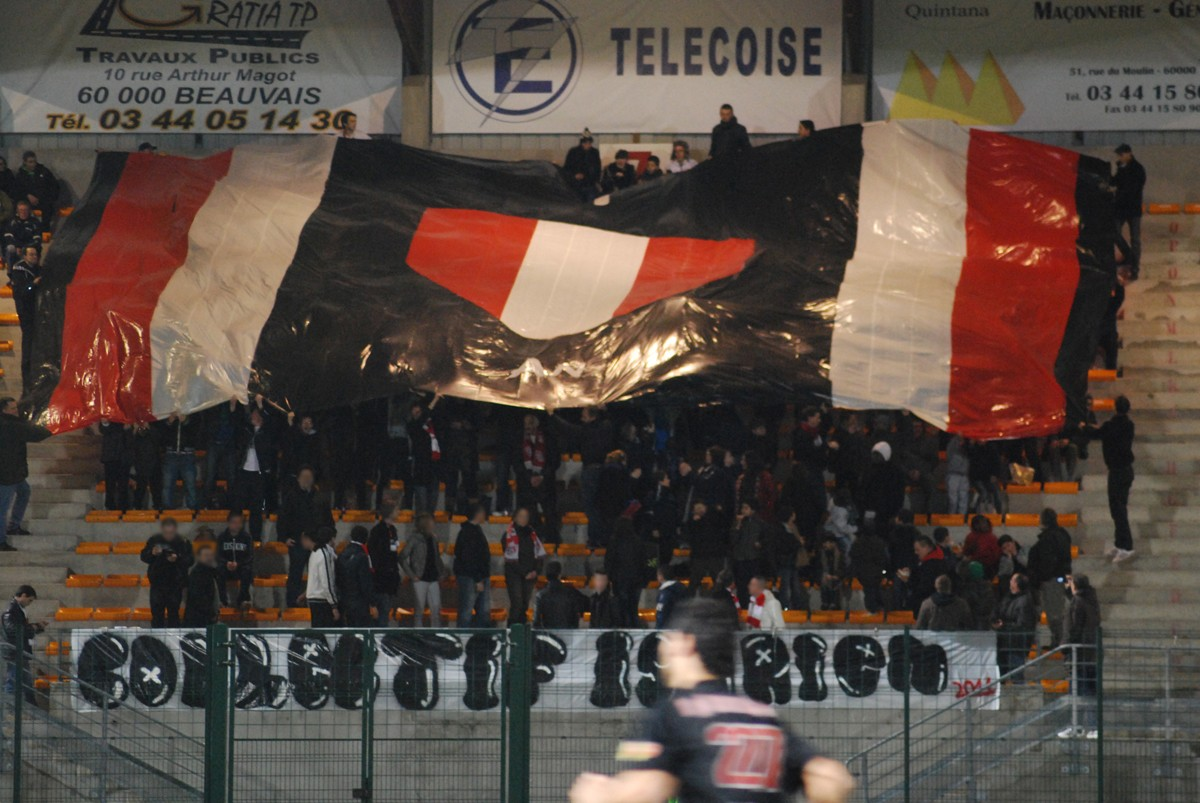

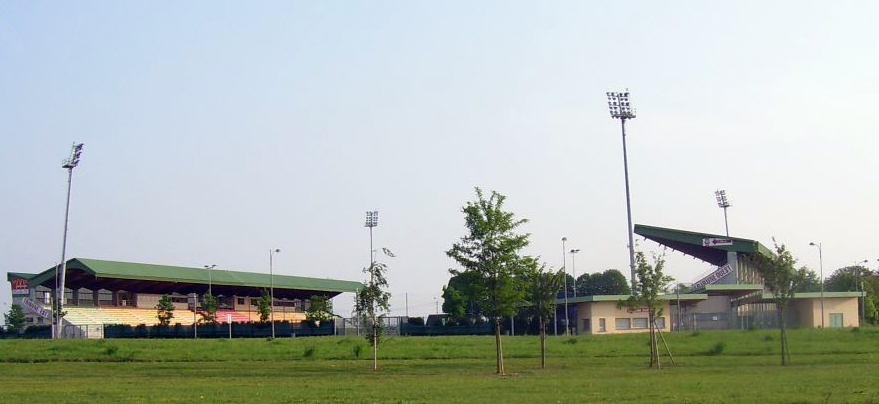

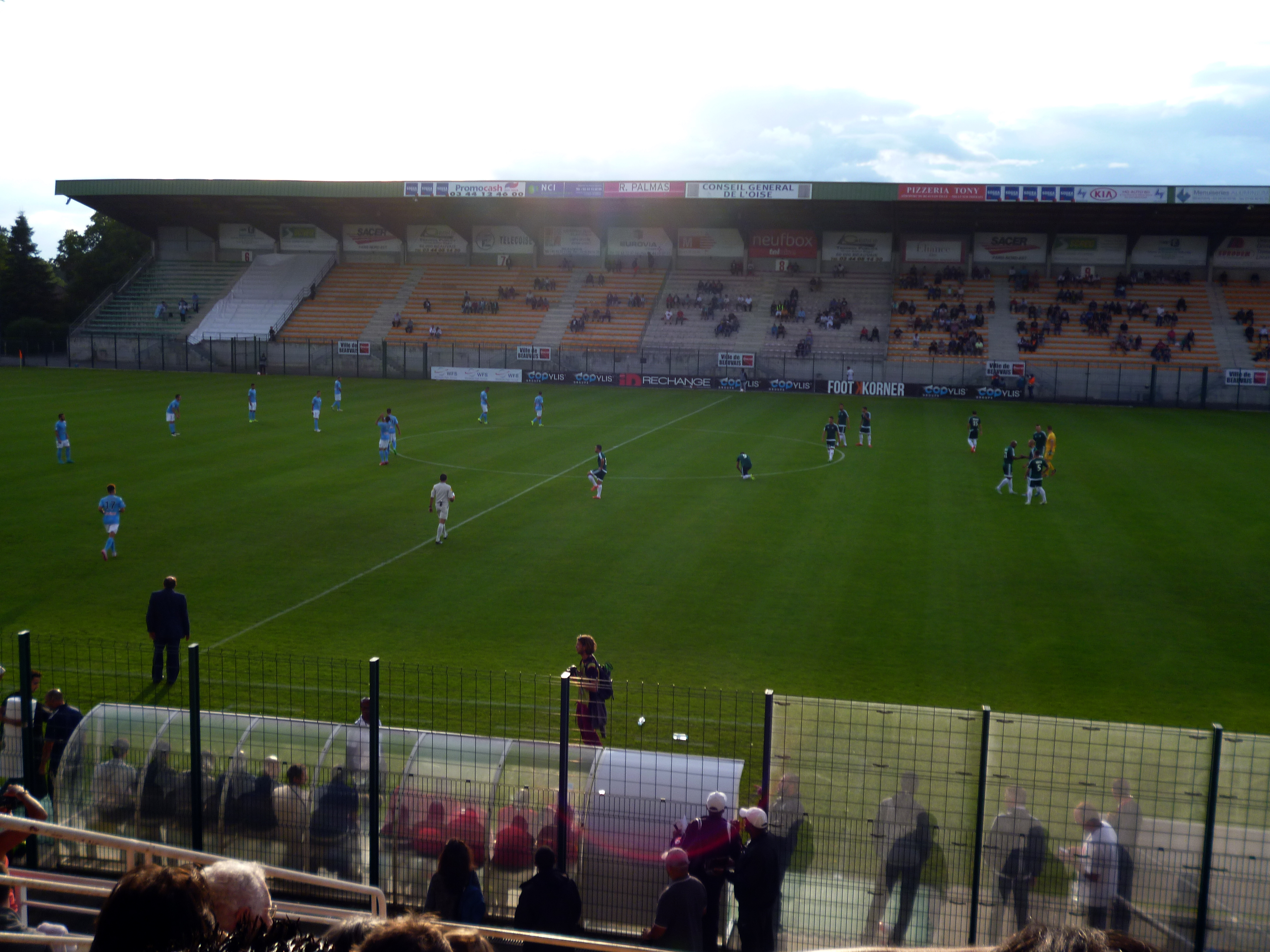
