= Julien Girard =

French footballer (born 1984)

Personal information
- Date of birth: 5 July 1984 (age 42)
- Place of birth: Saint-Martin-d'Hères, France
- Height: 1.83 m (6 ft 0 in)
- Position: Striker

Team information
- Current team: SO Romorantin

Senior career*
Years	Team	Apps	(Gls)
2003–2007	FC Gueugnon (B team)		
2004–2007	FC Gueugnon	7	(0)
2007–2008	AFC Compiègne		
2008–	SO Romorantin		
- * Club domestic league appearances and goals as of 18:49, 30 November 2009 (UTC)

Julien Girard (born 5 July 1984 in Saint-Martin-d'Hères) is a French professional footballer. He currently plays in the Championnat de France amateur for SO Romorantin.

Girard played at the professional level in Ligue 2 for FC Gueugnon.
