= US Albi =

French football club

- Full name: Union Sportive Albigeoise
- Founded: 1912
- Ground: (France) Stade Maurice Rigaud
- Capacity: 3,000
- Chairman: Jean-François Perez
- Manager: Patrick Gougginsperg
- League: CFA Group C
- 2008–09: CFA Group C, 14th
| Home colours | Away colours |

Union Sportive Albigeoise is a French association football team founded in 1912. They are based in Albi, Midi-Pyrénées, France and are currently playing in the Championnat de France Amateurs Group C. They play at the Stade Maurice Rigaud in Albi, which has a capacity of 3,000.

== Honours ==
- Midi-Pyrénées championship: 1960, 1968, 1978, 1992, 1996

== Current squad ==
As of November 2009.

Note: Flags indicate national team as defined under FIFA eligibility rules; some limited exceptions apply. Players may hold more than one non-FIFA nationality.

| No. | Pos. | Nation | Player |
|---|---|---|---|
| — | GK | FRA | Vincent Guiraud |
| — | DF | FRA | Yoann Alibert |
| — | DF | FRA | Julien Andreatta |
| — | DF | FRA | Aurélien Calbou |
| — | DF | FRA | Mickaël Cognard |
| — | DF | FRA | Sébastien Cros |
| — | DF | FRA | Nicolas Kolczynski |
| — | MF | FRA | Nicolas Blanc |
| — | MF | FRA | Mustapha Dakhlaoui |

| No. | Pos. | Nation | Player |
|---|---|---|---|
| — | MF | FRA | Damien Martinez |
| — | MF | FRA | Mourad Muhsin |
| — | MF | BFA | Claude Nduwayo |
| — | MF | FRA | Abderraman Ryah |
| — | MF | CHA | Mahamat Saleh |
| — | FW | SEN | El-Hadji Arona Niang |
| — | FW | FRA | Mehdi Khamoussi |
| — | FW | FRA | Xavier Julia |
| — | FW | FRA | Anthony Sanchez |

== Staff ==
| Name | Position |
|---|---|
| Patrick Gougginsperg | Coach |
| Christian Guibbal | Assistant Coach |
| Poupon Danimbe | Technical Assistant |
| Christian Guillot | Technical Assistant |
| Ahmad Khadem | Technical Assistant |
| Louis Cance | Technical Assistant |
