= Guilherme Mauricio =

French footballer (born 1974)

Personal information
- Full name: Guilherme Mauricio
- Date of birth: 12 October 1974 (age 52)
- Place of birth: Clichy, Hauts-de-Seine, France
- Height: 1.76 m (5 ft 9 in)
- Position: Midfielder

Senior career*
Years	Team	Apps	(Gls)
1994–1999	Red Star	176	(29)
1999–2006	Laval	240	(80)
2006–2007	Châteauroux	45	(10)
2008–2009	Laval	49	(7)
2009–2013	La Vitréenne	107	(25)
Total		617	(151)
- * Club domestic league appearances and goals

Guilherme Mauricio (born 12 October 1974) is a French former professional footballer who played as a midfielder.
