= Mickaël Brisset =

French footballer (born 1985)

Personal information
- Date of birth: 26 March 1985 (age 41)
- Place of birth: Issy-les-Moulineaux, France
- Height: 1.75 m (5 ft 9 in)
- Position: Striker

Team information
- Current team: Creil

Senior career*
Years	Team	Apps	(Gls)
2002–2004	Angers	28	(2)
2004–2005	Angoulême	26	(10)
2005–2006	Paris FC	14	(1)
2006–2007	Lorient	0	(0)
2007–2008	Tournai	20	(1)
2008–2009	La Louvière Centre	26	(9)
2009–2011	Ivry	64	(25)
2011–2012	Besançon	26	(2)
2012–2013	Ivry	26	(6)
2013	Chambly	7	(2)
2014	Aubervilliers	12	(8)
2014–2015	Beauvais	10	(4)
2015–2016	Aubervilliers	21	(6)
2016–2017	Louhans-Cuiseaux	2	(1)
2017–2018	Capricorne		
2018	RC Paris	8	(2)
2019	Gobelins Paris 13	8	(0)
2019–2020	Saint-Denis		
2020–	Creil		
- * Club domestic league appearances and goals as of 13 February 2022

Mickaël Brisset (born 26 March 1985) is a French footballer who plays as a forward for Régional 3 club Creil.

== Career ==
Due to a birth defect he has no left forearm.

He played on the professional level in Ligue 2 for Angers SCO.

In 2020, Brisset signed with Régional 3 club Creil, which would become the nineteenth club he played for.
