= Jean-Marc Oroque =

French footballer (born 1983)

Personal information
- Date of birth: 10 June 1983 (age 43)
- Place of birth: Bourg-la-Reine, France
- Height: 1.80 m (5 ft 11 in)
- Position: Midfielder

Team information
- Current team: Paulhan-Pézenas

Senior career*
Years	Team	Apps	(Gls)
2001–2002	Beauvais B		
2002–2004	Beauvais	17	(0)
2004–2005	Sainte-Geneviève		
2005–2006	Sète	1	(0)
2006–2008	Romorantin	57	(3)
2008–2009	Entente SSG	24	(0)
2009–2010	Sénart-Moissy	31	(8)
2010–2014	Chartres	45	(6)
2014–	Paulhan-Pézenas		
- * Club domestic league appearances and goals

Jean-Marc Oroque (born 10 June 1983) is a French professional footballer who plays as a midfielder for Départemental 1 club Paulhan-Pézenas.
