= 2001–02 French Division 2 =

63rd season of the second-tier football league in France

Division 2
- Season: 2001–02

The Division 2 season 2001/2002, organised by the LNF was won by AC Ajaccio and saw the promotions of AC Ajaccio, RC Strasbourg OGC Nice and Le Havre AC, whereas Nîmes Olympique and FC Martigues were relegated to National.

== 20 participating teams ==
- Ajaccio
- Amiens
- Beauvais
- Caen
- Châteauroux
- Créteil
- Grenoble
- Gueugnon
- Istres
- Laval
- Le Havre
- Le Mans
- Martigues
- Nancy
- Nice
- Nîmes
- Niort
- Saint-Étienne
- Strasbourg
- Wasquehal

== League table ==
Pos	Team	Pld	W	D	L	GF	GA	GD	Pts	Promotion or Relegation
1	Ajaccio (C, P)	38	20	12	6	47	25	+22	72	Promotion to Ligue 1
2	Strasbourg (P)	38	19	11	8	47	27	+20	68	Promotion to Ligue 1
3	Nice (P)	38	20	6	12	56	40	+16	66	Promotion to Ligue 1
4	Le Havre (P)	38	17	14	7	56	32	+24	65	Promotion to Ligue 1
5	Le Mans	38	16	10	12	48	41	+7	58	
6	Caen	38	16	10	12	59	55	+4	58	
7	Beauvais	38	13	18	7	37	25	+12	57	
8	Châteauroux	38	15	8	15	41	42	−1	53	
9	Nancy	38	12	15	11	42	38	+4	51	
10	Laval	38	14	8	16	50	56	−6	50	
11	Niort	38	11	15	12	40	39	+1	48	
12	Amiens	38	11	14	13	46	50	−4	47	
13	Saint-Étienne	38	11	13	14	35	42	−7	46	
14	Gueugnon	38	9	17	12	42	49	−7	44	
15	Wasquehal	38	11	10	17	43	55	−12	43	
16	Grenoble	38	10	12	16	38	55	−17	42	
17	Istres	38	8	17	13	34	43	−9	41	
18	Créteil	38	9	14	15	35	46	−11	41	
19	Nîmes (R)	38	5	17	16	33	48	−15	32	Relegation to Championnat National [fr]
20	Martigues (R)	38	7	11	20	32	53	−21	32	Relegation to Championnat National [fr]

Source: Ligue 2
(C) Champions; (P) Promoted; (R) Relegated

== Recap ==
- Promoted to L1 : AC Ajaccio, RC Strasbourg, OGC Nice, Le Havre AC
- Relegated to L2 : FC Metz, FC Lorient
- Promoted to L2 : Clermont Foot, Stade de Reims, ASOA Valence, Toulouse FC
- Relegated to National : Nîmes Olympique, FC Martigues

== Results ==
Home \ Away	ACA	AMI	BEA	CAE	CHA	CRE	GRE	GUE	IST	LAV	LHA	MFC	MAR	NAL	NIC	NMS	NRT	STE	STR	WAS
Ajaccio		1–1	1–0	1–1	0–1	1–0	2–0	1–1	1–1	2–0	3–0	1–0	1–0	4–2	1–1	3–1	1–0	1–0	2–1	2–0
Amiens	1–1		0–1	3–2	0–1	2–1	3–0	0–0	1–2	1–1	2–0	0–4	4–0	1–1	2–0	2–1	0–2	2–1	0–2	2–0
Beauvais	0–0	1–1		1–1	1–1	2–0	1–0	0–1	0–0	2–0	1–1	1–1	2–0	0–1	1–0	1–3	0–0	3–0	1–0	0–0
Caen	1–1	2–4	3–2		1–1	3–0	3–2	2–2	1–1	1–2	0–0	2–0	1–0	1–0	1–0	1–0	2–1	2–4	2–1	1–0
Châteauroux	0–2	2–0	0–0	0–2		1–0	0–0	1–0	1–1	1–2	4–2	0–2	2–3	1–1	1–0	0–0	2–1	4–0	1–2	3–2
Créteil	0–2	1–1	1–0	4–2	2–2		1–1	3–1	1–1	0–0	0–0	1–0	2–1	1–3	0–2	1–1	1–3	1–1	0–0	2–0
Grenoble	0–1	4–0	0–0	4–3	0–2	1–2		0–0	0–5	3–0	1–0	1–1	3–2	2–3	1–2	1–1	2–1	1–0	0–3	2–1
Gueugnon	1–2	2–1	0–0	2–2	2–0	0–0	1–1		1–1	3–4	1–1	1–1	1–2	1–0	2–0	4–3	1–2	1–1	0–0	1–2
Istres	2–2	1–2	0–2	0–3	2–0	0–0	1–1	2–0		2–2	1–3	0–1	0–0	1–0	0–1	0–0	1–1	1–0	0–1	2–1
Laval	2–1	2–2	0–1	0–1	2–1	2–1	1–2	0–1	2–0		1–1	1–2	2–1	1–0	3–4	1–0	1–3	1–1	3–0	3–0
Le Havre	0–1	2–1	0–0	2–1	3–1	3–1	4–0	2–1	2–0	4–1		3–0	5–0	0–0	1–1	3–0	2–0	0–0	1–1	1–0
Le Mans	2–1	1–1	2–2	1–2	1–0	0–1	2–0	2–3	2–2	0–3	2–0		1–0	1–0	1–0	1–0	3–1	3–0	1–0	2–2
Martigues	0–1	1–1	0–2	2–1	1–0	3–1	0–1	2–0	1–1	0–0	1–3	2–2		0–0	3–3	2–0	1–1	1–1	0–1	0–2
Nancy	1–0	1–1	2–2	3–3	2–0	0–0	1–0	0–1	1–1	2–1	1–1	0–1	1–1		1–0	1–1	2–0	0–3	2–1	0–1
Nice	3–1	3–0	0–1	2–1	1–2	2–1	4–1	3–0	3–0	2–1	0–1	3–2	1–0	1–0		2–0	3–1	1–1	2–1	2–1
Nîmes	0–1	1–1	1–1	2–2	0–1	1–1	1–1	3–1	0–0	3–0	0–0	1–0	0–0	2–2	0–3		0–0	0–0	1–3	2–3
Niort	0–0	2–2	0–0	2–0	1–2	1–1	0–0	1–1	2–0	1–1	2–2	1–0	2–1	0–0	3–0	0–0		0–2	1–1	1–0
Saint-Étienne	1–0	2–1	1–2	0–1	1–0	1–0	1–1	1–1	1–2	3–1	0–1	2–2	1–0	1–3	0–0	1–0	1–0		1–1	0–2
Strasbourg	0–0	1–0	1–1	3–1	2–0	0–2	1–1	0–0	2–0	4–1	1–0	2–0	1–0	2–2	3–0	1–0	1–0	1–0		1–0
Wasquehal	1–1	0–0	3–2	2–0	0–2	2–1	1–0	3–3	1–0	0–2	2–2	1–1	2–1	0–3	1–1	3–4	2–3	1–1	1–1	

Source: Ligue 2
Legend: Blue = home team win; Yellow = draw; Red = away team win.

== Top goalscorers ==
Rank	Player	Club	Goals
1	(Ivory Coast) Hamed Diallo	Amiens	19
2	(France) Guilherme Mauricio	Laval	17
3	(Algeria) Nassim Akrour	Istres	16
3	(France) Christophe Meslin	Nice	16
5	(France) Xavier Gravelaine	Caen	15
5	(Federal Republic of Yugoslavia) Danijel Ljuboja	Strasbourg	15
7	(France) Lilian Compan	Châteauroux	14
7	(France) Alain Caveglia	Le Havre	14
9	(France) Cyrille Watier	Caen	13
10	(Gabon) Daniel Cousin	Le Mans	12

== Attendances ==
#	Club	Average
1	Saint-Étienne	15,928
2	Caen	11,221
3	Strasbourg	9,499
4	Le Havre	9,246
5	Amiens	8,114
6	Nice	6,800
7	La Berrichonne	6,211
8	Nancy	4,946
9	Grenoble	4,891
10	Le Mans	4,395
11	Chamois niortais	4,295
12	Nîmes	4,154
13	Beauvais	4,075
14	Stade lavallois	3,834
15	Gueugnon	3,348
16	Ajaccio	2,664
17	Créteil	2,044
18	Wasquehal	1,730
19	Martigues	1,567
20	Istres	1,027
