= 2010–11 Championnat National =

Championnat National
- Season: 2010–11
- Champions: Bastia
- Promoted: Bastia; Amiens; Guingamp
- Relegated: Plabennec; Alfortville; Gueugnon; Rodez; Bayonne
- Matches: 422
- Goals: 997 (2.36 per match)
- Top goalscorer: Thibault Giresse (21 goals)
- Biggest home win: Guingamp 5–0 Gap (29 September 2010); Bastia 5–0 Gap (8 October 2010); Bastia 6–1 Plabennec (23 October 2010); Guingamp 5–0 Gueugnon (18 March 2011)
- Biggest away win: Alfortville 0–6 Guingamp (22 April 2011)
- Highest scoring: Guingamp 6–3 Alfortville (9 November 2010)
- Longest winning run: 8 games Bastia (28 September – 13 November)
- Longest unbeaten run: 30 games Bastia (28 September – 28 May)
- Longest losing run: 8 games Colmar (27 August – 8 October)
- Highest attendance: 12,124 – Strasbourg 2–0 Colmar (11 September 2010)
- Lowest attendance: 250 – Alfortville 1–2 Créteil (14 September 2010)
- Average attendance: 2,177

The 2010–11 Championnat National season was the 13th since its establishment. Évian were the defending champions. The fixtures were announced on 5 July 2010 and the season began on 6 August and ended on 27 May 2011. The winter break was in effect between 22 December and 11 January 2011. There were four promoted teams from the Championnat de France amateur, replacing the four teams that were relegated from the Championnat National following the 2009–10 season. A total of 21 teams currently competes in the league with five clubs suffering relegation to the fourth division, the Championnat de France amateur. All clubs that secured league status for the season were subject to approval by the DNCG before becoming eligible to participate.

On 22 April 2011, Bastia became the first club to achieve promotion to Ligue 2 following the club's 1–1 draw with Fréjus Saint-Raphaël. Coupled with fourth-place Strasbourg's draw with Luzenac on the same day, the results made it mathematically impossible for the Alsatians to catch Bastia in the standings. Two weeks later, following a 2–1 win over Créteil and a 1–1 draw between second-place Amiens and Cannes, Bastia were declared champions of the Championnat National. On 13 May, Amiens became the second club to achieve promotion to Ligue 2 after defeating third-place rivals Guingamp 3–1. Guingamp later achieved promotion on the final day of the season after defeating Rouen 3–1.

On 9 April 2011, Gueugnon were forced by a commercial tribunal of the commune of Mâcon to enter liquidation as a result of the club's debts and its repeated delays of paying its players. As a result of the ruling, the French Football Federation forfeited Gueugnon's remaining matches in the league giving 3–0 victories to the opposition, which resulted in the club's automatic relegation. On 26 April, Alfortville became the second club to suffer relegation to the Championnat de France amateur following its 2–0 loss away to Niort. On the final day of the season, Plabennec, Rodez, and Bayonne were relegated to the Championnat de France amateur.

== Teams ==
=== Team changes ===
Location of teams in 2010–11 Championnat National

On 7 May 2010, the first movement of clubs in the league occurred following Bastia's relegation from Ligue 2. The club drew 0–0 with Tours which, following a positive result for Strasbourg on the same day, made it mathematically impossible for the club to remain in Ligue 2. On 14 May, on the final day of the Ligue 2 season, Strasbourg and Guingamp were both relegated to the Championnat National. Guingamp, who played in the UEFA Europa League due to the club's Coupe de France triumph the previous season, won its final league match, but, due to other results, finished in 18th position. Strasbourg, who were one of the favourites to earn promotion to the first division, lost on the final day and the club's relegation was confirmed following other results. Strasbourg had suffered relegation from Ligue 1 to the second division the previous season meaning the club faltered down two divisions in just two seasons.

On 8 May, Niort became the first club to achieve promotion to the Championnat National from the Championnat France de amateur. The club defeated Pau 4–0 on the match day. Following second place club Yzeure's 2–1 loss to the reserves of Le Mans, Niort's promotion was assured. A week later, Orléans achieved promotion following the club's 2–1 victory over the Caen reserves. The victory assured the club a spot in National and also pushed the club over 100 points; a rarity in the fourth division. On 22 May, Colmar earned promotion to National, despite drawing 2–2 with relegation-bound Marck. The club's promotion was guaranteed following Alfortville's 2–1 loss to Amnéville.

Colmar's place in the league came up for discussion after Alfortville, the second-place finisher in the group, appealed to the French Football Federation to award the club a 3–0 victory over the reserves of Lens after it was determined that Lens played with a suspended player. The ruling was determined on 26 June with the Comité National Olympique et Sportif Français (CNOSF) giving an unfavorable ruling to Alfortville. Following the ruling, Alfortville announced its intent to appeal to a Tribunal administratif, however, on 16 July, the French Football Federation stepped in and ruled in favour of Alfortville giving the club a place in the Championnat National. Colmar will remain in the league alongside Alfortville, thus giving National a league of 21 clubs. On 29 May, the final day of the season, the final CFA club achieved promotion to National. Gap defeated the reserves of Lyon 3–0 to claim the final berth in the third division.

Teams relegated to Championnat National

- Guingamp
- Strasbourg
- Bastia

Teams promoted to Championnat National

- Colmar (Groupe A winners and champions)
- Gap (Groupe B winners)
- Niort (Groupe C winners)
- Orléans (Groupe D winners)
- Alfortville (Groupe A runner-up)

=== DNCG rulings ===
On 15 June 2010, following a review of each club's administrative and financial accounts in the Championnat National, the DNCG ruled that both Bastia and Gueugnon would be relegated to the Championnat de France amateur, while Amiens, Guingamp, and Strasbourg were having its accounts subjected to further deliberation to determine whether each club could retain its professional status. Both Bastia and Gueugnon had the option to appeal the decision. On 25 June 2010, the Corsican Assembly and the General Council of Haute-Corse approved grants of €800,000 and €150,000 to be given to Bastia in order for the club to meet the DNCG's financial requirements, which would allow the club to remain in the Championnat National. However, on 6 July, the DNCG remained firm on its stance relegating the club to the fourth division after questioning the legitimacy of the grants and the sale of the club's training center. Bastia president, Julien Lolli, remained confident that the club would play in the Championnat National and issued an appeal to the CNOSF, the National Sporting Committee of France, the same day. On 2 July, the DNCG announced that Gueugnon would remain in National after the club successfully appealed to the organisation. On 16 July, the CNOSF ruled against the DNCG and announced that Bastia should play in the Championnat National. The club's place in the league was confirmed upon the release of the league table.

On 2 July, local media in Alsace reported that Strasbourg were on the verge of being relegated to the Championnat de France amateur by the DNCG due to financial issues. The club responded by announcing its willingness to appeal if the news reported was confirmed. With the club's accounts still being reviewed, Strasbourg's financial issues were slightly alleviated after the sale of striker Magaye Gueye to English club Everton for €1.4 million. Strasbourg later transferred captain Guillaume Lacour and Algerian international Yacine Bezzaz to Évian and Troyes, respectively, for nominal fees. On 16 July, the report was confirmed when the DNCG officially relegated Strasbourg to the CFA. Strasbourg appealed the decision the following week. On 22 July, Strasbourg's appeal was successful with the DNCG ruling in favour of a return to National. The return of Strasbourg to National means that twenty-one clubs competed in the 2010–11 edition of the league.

=== Stadia and locations ===
Club	Location	Venue	Capacity	Average attendance^{1}
Alfortville	Créteil	Parc des Sports	1,500	217
Amiens	Amiens	Stade de la Licorne	12,097	5,201
Bastia	Bastia	Stade Armand Cesari	10,130	4,296
Bayonne	Bayonne	Stade Didier Deschamps	3,500	369
Beauvais	Beauvais	Stade Pierre Brisson	10,178	1,878
Cannes	Cannes	Stade Pierre de Coubertin	12,800	1,869
Colmar	Colmar	Colmar Stadium	7,000	1,692
Créteil	Créteil	Stade Dominique Duvauchelle	12,150	515
Fréjus	Fréjus	Stade Pourcin	2,500	1,427
Gap	Gap	Stade Municipal de Gap	5,000	558
Gueugnon	Gueugnon	Stade Jean Laville	13,872	785
Guingamp	Guingamp	Stade du Roudourou	18,126	6,794
Luzenac	Luzenac	Stade Paul Fédou	1,000	525
Niort	Niort	Stade René Gaillard	10,898	2,999
Orléans	Orléans	Stade de la Source	6,000	1,846
Pacy Vallée-d'Eure	Pacy-sur-Eure	Stade Pacy-Ménilles	2,000	598
Paris	Paris	Stade Sébastien Charléty	20,000	538
Plabennec	Plabennec	Stade Municipal de Kervéguen	5,000	1,010
Rodez	Rodez	Stade Paul Lignon	6,000	1,415
Rouen	Rouen	Stade Robert Diochon	10,000	2,944
Strasbourg	Strasbourg	Stade de la Meinau	29,230	6,079

^{1}Source

=== Personnel and kits ===
Team	Manager^{1}	Captain^{1}	Kit Manufacturer^{1}	Shirt Sponsor^{1}
Alfortville	Azzedine Meguellatti	Hakim Saci	Duarig	Partouche Casino
Amiens	Ludovic Batelli	Stéphane Mangione	Lotto	Amiens Métropole
Bastia	Frédéric Hantz	Yannick Cahuzac	Uhlsport	IDEC
Bayonne	Alain Pochat	Mickael Caradec	Duarig	Forge Adour
Beauvais	Alex Clément	Léonard Mendy	Erreà	Odalys Vacances
Cannes	Victor Zvunka	Vincent Di Bartoloméo	Kappa	Ma Nouvelle Mutuelle
Colmar	Damien Ott	Régis Kittler	Erreà	Patrick Sports
Créteil	Hubert Velud	Sebastien Gondouin	Nike	SFB Béton
Fréjus	Athos Bandini	Grégory Dutil	Lotto	Géant
Gap	Patrick Bruzzichessi	Franck Turpin	Nike	Risoul
~~Gueugnon~~	Serge Romano	Tony Vairelles	Lotto	KAPIA
Guingamp	Jocelyn Gourvennec	Lionel Mathis	Adidas	Groupe Stalaven
Luzenac	Christophe Pélissier	Sébastien Mignotte	Erreà	Groupe Scopelec
Niort	Pascal Gastien	Carl Tourenne	Erreà	Cheminées Poujoulat
Orléans	Yann Lachuer	Yozip Lemée	Umbro	CTVL
Paris	Jean-Luc Vannuchi	Fabien Valéri	Nike	Nexity
Pacy Vallée-d'Eure	Laurent Hatton	Dominique Sylva	Madsport	Caoudal Bâtiments Services
Plabennec	Franck Kerdilès	Laurent David	Erreà	Legall
Rodez	Franck Rizzetto	Freddy Castanier	Duarig	Aveyron Conseil Général
Rouen	Éric Garcin	Pierre Vignaud	Hummel	Promaritime International
Strasbourg	Laurent Fournier	Milovan Sikimić	Hummel	Electricité de Strasbourg

^{1} Subject to change during the season.

=== Managerial changes ===
Team	Outgoing manager	Manner of departure	Date of vacancy	Table	Incoming manager	Date of appointment	Table
Guingamp	Victor Zvunka	Resigned	15 May 2010	Off-season	Jocelyn Gourvennec	17 May 2010	Off-season
Bastia	Faruk Hadzibegic	Resigned	17 May 2010	Off-season	Frédéric Hantz	22 May 2010	Off-season
Créteil	Laurent Fournier	Resigned	21 May 2010	Off-season	Hubert Velud	25 May 2010	Off-season
Strasbourg	Pascal Janin	Resigned	29 May 2010	Off-season	Laurent Fournier	9 June 2010	Off-season
Gueugnon	René Le Lamer	End of contract	21 May 2010	Off-season	Serge Romano	7 July 2010	Off-season
Gap	Franck Priou	Signed for Martigues	31 May 2010	Off-season	Patrick Bruzzichessi	6 June 2010	Off-season
Alfortville	William Longuet	Fired	5 October 2010	21st	Azzedine Meguellatti	23 November 2010	21st
Cannes	Albert Emon	Fired	31 January 2011	5th	Victor Zvunka	31 January 2011	5th

== League table ==
Pos	Team	Pld	W	D	L	GF	GA	GD	Pts	Promotion or Relegation
1	Bastia (C, P)	40	27	10	3	81	24	+57	91	Promotion to Ligue 2
2	Amiens (P)	40	24	12	4	58	27	+31	84	Promotion to Ligue 2
3	Guingamp (P)	40	23	11	6	87	36	+51	80	Promotion to Ligue 2
4	Strasbourg (D, R)	40	20	17	3	56	27	+29	77	Expelled (Note: Strasbourg and Cannes and Gueugnon were relegated due to bankruptcy.)
5	Cannes (D, R)	40	18	14	8	51	35	+16	68	Expelled
6	Fréjus	40	19	10	11	56	41	+15	67	
7	Beauvais	40	15	16	9	53	48	+5	61	
8	Rouen	40	15	14	11	54	44	+10	59	
9	Orléans	40	13	14	13	43	40	+3	53	
10	Créteil	40	13	12	15	41	48	−7	51	
11	Luzenac	40	12	13	15	39	44	−5	49	
12	Paris	40	11	16	13	45	46	−1	49	
13	Niort	40	13	10	17	46	46	0	49	
14	Pacy Vallée-d'Eure (Note: Pacy Vallée-d'Eure were docked two points after the club endured financial difficulties, which resulted in the club's failure to pay its players and staff.) (D, R)	40	13	8	19	41	47	−6	45	Expelled
15	Colmar	40	11	11	18	34	48	−14	44	
16	Gap (Note: Gap was relegated due to being financially debted.) (D, R)	40	11	10	19	44	62	−18	43	Relegated to 2011-12 Championnat de France amateur due to financial difficulties
17	Bayonne	40	11	10	19	36	58	−22	43	
18	Rodez (R)	40	11	7	22	41	63	−22	40	Relegation to Championnat de France amateur
19	Plabennec (R)	40	9	12	19	33	52	−19	39	Relegation to Championnat de France amateur
20	Alfortville (R)	40	6	10	24	36	79	−43	28	Relegation to Championnat de France amateur
21	Gueugnon (Note: Gueugnon forfeited the rest of its matches for the season following the club's liquidation.) (D, R)	40	3	7	30	21	81	−60	16	Expelled

Source: French Football Federation
Rules for classification: 1) points; 2) goal difference; 3) number of goals scored.
(C) Champions; (D) Disqualified; (P) Promoted; (R) Relegated

== Results ==
Home \ Away	UJA	AMI	BAS	BAY	BEA	CAN	COL	CRE	FRE	GAP	GUE	GUI	LUZ	NRT	ORL	PAR	PVE	PLA	ROD	ROU	RCS
Alfortville		2–4	0–4	1–1	0–0	0–0	0–1	1–1	1–2	0–0	3–0	0–6	1–2	0–1	0–2	2–1	1–1	0–2	0–2		1–3
Amiens	3–1		1–0	1–1	2–0	2–0	1–0	2–1	1–0	1–0	3–2	2–1	1–1	2–1	0–0	2–0	2–0	1–0	5–1	2–1	1–1
Bastia	1–1	1–0		4–2	5–1	0–0	3–0	2–1	1–0	5–0	3–0	2–0	1–0	2–1	0–0	3–0	0–0	6–1	0–0	0–0	1–0
Bayonne	0–4	0–2	1–2		0–1	2–0	1–1	0–1	2–1	3–0	0–0	0–0	0–1	2–1	2–1	0–0	0–1	1–0		3–3	1–2
Beauvais	2–2	0–0	1–4	3–0		2–1	0–0	0–0	1–1	1–1	3–1	2–2	0–0	4–2	1–2	3–2	3–2	0–0	3–2	1–1	2–1
Cannes	3–0	1–1	2–1	3–0	0–0		2–1	1–0	1–1	0–1	2–1	0–0	2–0	1–0	4–2	0–0	0–0	1–0	2–0	3–2	1–0
Colmar	0–0	0–0	0–0	0–1	1–2	0–3			3–2	4–2	0–0	0–3	3–1	0–3	1–0	0–2	1–2	0–0	1–0	0–0	1–2
Créteil	3–2	1–3	1–2	1–0	0–1	2–2	0–2		0–1	1–1	2–0	1–2	3–0	4–2	0–1	0–0		0–0	3–1	0–0	0–0
Fréjus	2–1	0–1	1–1	3–0	1–0	0–0	1–1	3–0		2–1	3–0	1–1	1–0	1–0	1–1	3–1	1–0	2–0	2–1	1–0	1–2
Gap	1–1	0–1	0–2	4–0	2–1	2–3	2–2	1–2	2–2		1–0	0–0	2–0	1–1	2–1	0–1	1–0	3–1	4–0	1–3	1–1
Gueugnon	0–2	1–2	1–4	0–2	0–3	2–4	0–3	0–1	2–1	0–3		1–2	0–2	0–0	0–1	1–1	0–3	0–3	0–0	0–0	1–1
Guingamp	6–3	1–2	2–5	2–2	3–0	4–0	2–0	5–1	3–1	5–0	5–0		4–1		4–1	2–0	2–1	3–1	3–1	1–0	0–0
Luzenac	4–0	1–1	1–5	1–1	1–1	1–0	0–1	0–0	0–1	3–0	2–0	1–1		0–0	4–2	2–1	0–0	2–0	2–0	2–2	1–1
Niort	2–0	2–2	2–0	4–0	1–2	0–2	1–1	3–1	0–3	2–0	3–0		2–3		0–0	0–0	0–2	2–0	3–2	2–1	0–2
Orléans	0–1	0–0	0–2	0–1	2–3	1–1	2–0	0–0	3–0	4–0	1–0	1–1	1–0	1–1		1–1	2–0	2–1	0–1	2–2	1–1
Paris	5–1	1–0	1–2	0–2	2–2	1–1	0–1	2–2	1–1	1–0	3–0	1–1	1–0	1–0	1–3		2–0	1–1	3–1	2–0	2–2
Pacy Vallée-d'Eure	1–0	2–1	1–2	2–1	0–2	1–0	2–1	2–3	2–3	2–1	3–4	0–1	0–0	1–0	0–0	2–0		1–1	0–1	2–4	0–0
Plabennec	1–2	0–0	0–3	2–0	0–0	0–0	2–1	1–0	1–3	1–1	3–0	1–1	2–0	1–2	1–1	2–1	1–3		3–1	0–1	0–2
Rodez	4–0	0–2	0–0	0–0	2–1	0–2	0–1	0–1	3–2	1–2	0–2	0–2	2–0	1–1	1–0	2–2	1–0	1–1		4–2	0–3
Rouen	2–1	2–0	0–1	3–1	1–1	2–0	2–1	3–0	1–1	2–0	1–0	0–2	0–0	1–0	0–1	1–1	3–2	2–0	1–1		1–2
Strasbourg	4–0	1–1	1–1	2–0	1–0	3–3	2–0	1–1	3–0	2–1	2–1	2–1	1–0	0–0	2–0	0–0	1–0	0–0	2–1	1–1	

Source: French Football Federation
Legend: Blue = home team win; Yellow = draw; Red = away team win.

== Statistics ==
=== Top goalscorers ===
Position	Player	Club	Goals
1	Thibault Giresse	Guingamp	21
2	David Suarez	Bastia	20
3	Jan Koller	Cannes	16
4	Mathieu Scarpelli	Guingamp	14
5	Mathieu Robail	Bastia	13
5	Ali Mathlouthi	Strasbourg	13
5	Patrice Vareilles	Fréjus	13
5	Mustapha Durak	Gap	13
5	Andé Dona Ndoh	Rouen	13
5	Mouritala Ogunbiyi	Guingamp	13

Last updated: 23 May 2011
Source: French Football Federation

=== Best player ===
For the second consecutive season, the French Football Federation will award a trophy to the Best Player of the Championnat National. The award is based on a points-system with each manager of each club in the league voting for two players not on their team following each match day. Depending on their selection, the two players voted by each manager are given points of either three or one. During the season, the points are added up every week and, following the season, the player with the most points is awarded the honour. The current winner of the award is Plabennec midfielder Laurent David.

Rank	Name	Position	Team	Points	Matches	Goals
1	Laurent David	MF	Plabennec	49	35	5
2	Anthony Moura-Komenan	MF	Rodez	45	34	8
3	Ali Mathlouthi	FW	Strasbourg	40	32	13
4	Wilfried Louisy-Daniel	FW	Beauvais	36	30	11
5	Cédric Moukouri	MF	Alfortville	35	33	7
6	Tony Vairelles	FW	Gueugnon	34	28	9
7	Sadio Diallo	MF	Bastia	33	30	9
8	Clément Rigaud	GK	Gap	32	33	0
9	Thomas Guerbert	FW	Luzenac	31	33	4
10	Mustapha Durak	FW	Gap	30	32	12

Last updated: 27 April 2011
Source: Best Player Standings
