= 2008–09 Championnat de France Amateur =

The 2008–09 Championnat de France Amateurs season was the 11th edition of the competition since its establishment. The competition officially began 9 August 2008 and ended on 30 May 2009. The competition consists of 72 clubs spread into four parallel groups of 18.

It is open to reserve teams in France and amateur clubs in France, although only the amateur clubs are eligible for promotion to the Championnat National. The highest-placed amateur team in each pool are promoted, replaced by the four lowest-placed in the Championnat.

== Promotion and relegation from 2007–08 ==
Relegated from Championnat National to CFA

- SO Romorantin to Groupe C
- FC Martigues to Groupe B
- Pau FC to Groupe C
- Villemomble Sports to Groupe D

Promoted from CFA to Championnat National

- Pacy Vallée-d'Eure
- Croix de Savoie Gaillard
- SO Cassis Carnoux
- Aviron Bayonnais FC

== Standings ==
Note: Unlike the higher leagues, a win in the CFA is worth 4 points, with 2 points for a draw and 1 for a defeat.

=== Groupe A ===
Pos	Team	Pld	W	D	L	GF	GA	GD	Pts	Promotion or relegation
1	Besançon (C, D, R)	34	22	6	6	67	34	+33	106	Expelled from the league
2	Compiègne	34	18	10	6	52	30	+22	98	
3	Mulhouse	34	18	8	8	47	33	+14	96	
4	Montceau Bourgogne	34	16	10	8	46	33	+13	92	
5	Colmar	34	14	12	8	33	29	+4	88	
6	Sochaux B	34	15	8	11	45	36	+9	87	
7	Dunkerque	34	12	13	9	43	39	+4	83	
8	Auxerre B	34	14	5	15	39	37	+2	81	
9	Lens B	34	12	9	13	45	40	+5	79	
10	Strasbourg B	34	11	11	12	34	35	−1	78	
11	Lille B	34	12	7	15	41	47	−6	77	
12	Raon-l'Étape	34	11	8	15	40	50	−10	75	
13	Sénart-Moissy	34	9	10	15	24	32	−8	71	
14	Noisy-le-Sec	34	9	9	16	31	43	−12	70	
15	Nancy B	34	7	15	12	32	41	−9	70	
16	Vesoul (R)	34	8	11	15	39	48	−9	69	Relegated to CFA 2
17	Metz B (R)	34	8	11	15	30	47	−17	69	Relegated to CFA 2
18	Sainte-Geneviève (R)	34	5	7	22	28	59	−31	56	Relegated to CFA 2

Updated to match(es) played on 30 May 2009. Source:
Rules for classification: 1) points; 2) goal difference; 3) number of goals scored.
(C) Champions; (D) Disqualified; (R) Relegated

=== Groupe B ===
Pos	Team	Pld	W	D	L	GF	GA	GD	Pts	Promotion or relegation
1	Hyères (P)	34	19	9	6	37	24	+13	100	Promoted to Championnat National
2	Fréjus	34	16	10	8	50	29	+21	92	
3	Villefranche	34	16	8	10	59	44	+15	90	
4	Andrézieux	34	13	14	7	43	29	+14	87	
5	Sporting Toulon	34	14	11	9	42	40	+2	87	
6	Martigues	34	14	11	9	51	39	+12	87	
7	Lyon B	34	14	10	10	52	36	+16	86	
8	Montpellier B	34	14	8	12	65	46	+19	84	
9	Gazélec Ajaccio	34	12	10	12	40	41	−1	80	
10	CA Bastia	34	11	12	11	55	64	−9	79	
11	Agde	34	10	13	11	39	49	−10	77	
12	Jura Sud	34	12	6	16	36	47	−11	76	
13	Marignane	34	9	13	12	27	31	−4	74	
14	Lyon Duchère	34	11	7	16	36	50	−14	74	
15	Gap	34	10	8	16	42	54	−12	72	
16	Saint-Étienne B (R)	34	7	14	13	40	45	−5	69	Relegated to CFA 2
17	Saint-Priest (R)	34	6	6	22	36	58	−22	58	Relegated to CFA 2
18	AS Monaco B (R)	34	7	9	18	34	57	−23	64	Relegated to CFA 2

Updated to match(es) played on 30 May 2009. Source:
Rules for classification: 1) points; 2) goal difference; 3) number of goals scored.
(P) Promoted; (R) Relegated

=== Groupe C ===
Pos	Team	Pld	W	D	L	GF	GA	GD	Pts	Promotion or relegation
1	Luzenac (P)	34	20	9	5	59	27	+32	103	Promoted to Championnat National
2	Moulins	34	18	8	8	56	41	+15	96	
3	Pau	34	18	8	8	42	25	+17	96	
4	Vendée Fontenay	34	16	9	9	37	32	+5	91	
5	Yzeure	34	15	9	10	60	43	+17	88	
6	Bordeaux B	34	14	10	10	41	35	+6	86	
7	Le Mans B	34	12	12	10	35	33	+2	82	
8	Romorantin	34	13	10	11	49	49	0	83	
9	Vendée Luçon	34	12	11	11	39	37	+2	81	
10	Aurillac	34	9	15	10	46	45	+1	76	
11	Colomiers	34	9	14	11	33	32	+1	75	
12	Montluçon	34	9	13	12	43	54	−11	74	
13	Albi	34	10	6	18	26	40	−14	70	
14	Balma	34	9	9	16	47	54	−7	70	
15	Genêts Anglet	34	9	8	17	35	53	−18	69	
16	Châtellerault (R)	34	7	13	14	48	64	−16	68	Relegated to CFA 2
17	Bordelais (R)	34	7	11	16	27	47	−20	66	Relegated to CFA 2
18	Bergerac (R)	34	4	16	14	32	47	−15	62	Relegated to CFA 2

Updated to match(es) played on 30 May 2009. Source:
Rules for classification: 1) points; 2) goal difference; 3) number of goals scored.
(P) Promoted; (R) Relegated

=== Groupe D ===
Pos	Team	Pld	W	D	L	GF	GA	GD	Pts	Promotion or relegation
1	Rouen (P)	34	18	11	5	56	28	+28	99	Promoted to Championnat National
2	Plabennec	34	16	12	6	41	31	+10	94	
3	Quevilly	34	15	12	7	53	31	+22	91	
4	Orléans	34	15	11	8	49	36	+13	90	
5	Villemomble	34	14	9	11	31	29	+2	85	
6	La Vitréenne	34	12	13	9	36	28	+8	83	
7	Rennes B	34	13	7	14	40	39	+1	80	
8	Racing	34	12	10	12	36	34	+2	80	
9	Viry-Châtillon	34	11	11	12	43	49	−6	78	
10	PSG B	34	12	7	15	38	44	−6	77	
11	SM Caen B	34	11	11	12	41	43	−2	78	
12	Alfortville	34	10	10	14	40	43	−3	74	
13	Quimper	34	9	12	13	28	41	−13	73	
14	Le Havre B	34	8	15	11	38	42	−4	73	
15	Pontivy	34	9	11	14	31	45	−14	72	
16	Red Star (R)	34	10	9	15	28	36	−8	73	Relegated to CFA 2
17	Guingamp B (R)	34	9	10	15	35	41	−6	71	Relegated to CFA 2
18	Vitré (R)	34	6	10	18	25	50	−25	62	Relegated to CFA 2

Updated to match(es) played on 30 May 2009. Source:
Rules for classification: 1) points; 2) goal difference; 3) number of goals scored.
(P) Promoted; (R) Relegated

== Playoffs ==
The Championnat de France Amateurs playoffs are designated for only the professional clubs B teams playing in the league. The best finishing professional reserve club in each group will advance to the playoffs where they will face each other at a site to be determined. The semi-final opponents are determined by the best finishing place. The best finishing reserve club will be awarded the 1st seed, while the worst finishing reserve club of the four will be awarded the 4th seed.

Semifinals
1	Lyon	1 (4)
4	Rennes	1 (3)
2	Bordeaux	2
3	Sochaux	3

Finals
1	Lyon	3
3	Sochaux	0

=== Semi-finals ===
2 June
18:00 CET

Lyon	1–1	Rennes
Valdivia 5'	Report	Boye 24'
Penalties
	4–3

Stade Gerland, Lyon

2 June
18:00 CET

Bordeaux	2–3	Sochaux
Bouscarrat 23'; Insou 62'	Report	Bakambu 11', 52'; Gurler 66'

Stade Galin, Bordeaux

=== Final ===
5 June
18:00 CET

Lyon	3–0	Sochaux
Court 8', 68'; Tafer 63'	Report

Stade René Blum, $2

== Top goalscorers ==
Last updated 3 May 2009

=== Groupe A ===
Position	Name	Nationality	Club	Goals
1	Thomas Régnier	France	FC Mulhouse	18
2	Yassin El Azzouzi	France	FC Montceau Bourgogne	17
3	Benoit Boulanger	France	AFC Compiègne	10
-	Ludovic Gamboa	France	AFC Compiègne	10
5	Hassan Benkajjane	France	US Raon-l'Étape	9

=== Groupe B ===
Position	Name	Nationality	Club	Goals
1	Romain Armand	France	Montpellier B	23
2	Grégory Dutil	France	ES Fréjus	18
3	Bruno Baretto	France	FC Villefranche Beaujolais	13
4	Stéphane Biakolo	Cameroon	ASF Andrézieux	12
5	Cyril Eboki-Poh	France	CA Bastia	11

=== Groupe C ===
Position	Name	Nationality	Club	Goals
1	Sylvain Komenan	Ivory Coast	EDS Montluçon	15
2	Marvin Ousmane Seck	France	Vendée Luçon	13
3	Pierre Aristouy	France	Pau FC	11
-	Tristan M'Bongo	France	US Luzenac	11
5	Raphaël Caceres	France	EDS Montluçon	10

=== Groupe D ===
Position	Name	Nationality	Club	Goals
1	César Da Costa	Senegal	FC Rouen	18
2	Ladislas Douniama	Congo	US Orléans	14
3	Kelton Agasson	France	ES Viry-Châtillon	13
-	Kevin Le Faix	France	AS Vitré	13
5	Gaëtan Charbonnier	France	PSG B	12
