= 2009–10 Championnat National =

Championnat National
- Season: 2009–10
- Champions: Évian
- Promoted: Reims; Troyes
- Relegated: Moulins; Hyères; Cassis; Louhans-Cuiseaux
- Matches: 380
- Goals: 907 (2.39 per match)
- Top goalscorer: Cédric Fauré (24)
- Biggest home win: Rouen 7–0 Louhans-Cuiseaux (8 September 2009); Amiens 8–1 Louhans-Cuiseaux (29 January 2010)
- Biggest away win: Louhans-Cuiseaux 0–5 Troyes (21 May 2010)
- Highest scoring: Amiens 8–1 Louhans-Cuiseaux (29 January 2010)

The 2009–10 Championnat National was the 17th edition of the 3rd division league. Play commenced on 7 August 2009 and ended on 21 May 2010.

== Promotion and relegation ==
Teams relegated from 2008–09 Ligue 2

- 18th Place: Amiens
- 19th Place: Reims
- 20th Place: Troyes

Teams promoted to 2009–10 Ligue 2

- Champions: Istres
- Runners-up: Laval
- 3rd Place: Arles

Teams promoted from 2008–09 Championnat de France Amateurs

- Champions, Groupe B: Hyères
- 2nd Place, Groupe B: Fréjus
- Champions, Groupe C: Luzenac
- 2nd Place, Groupe C: Moulins
- Champions, Groupe D: Rouen
- 2nd Place, Groupe D: Plabennec

Teams relegated to Championnat de France Amateurs 2009-10

- 17th Place: Niort
- 18th Place: Calais
- 19th Place: Cherbourg
- 20th Place: L'Entente
- DNCG Ruling: Libourne-Saint-Seurin
- DNCG Ruling: Besançon

== DNCG Rulings ==
All clubs that secured Championnat National status for next season were subject to approval by the DNCG before becoming eligible to participate.

Following the DNCG's annual report on clubs, on 25 June, it was announced that six clubs had been relegated from the National to lower divisions. AS Beauvais, SO Cassis Carnoux, CS Louhans-Cuiseaux, and FC Libourne Saint-Seurin were relegated to the Championnat de France Amateurs. Besançon RC, US Luzenac, and FC Rouen, who were all recently promoted, were relegated to Championnat de France Amateurs 2, while FC Sète and Calais RUFC were relegated to the Division d'Honneur. All clubs relegated were allowed to appeal the decision.

Following an appeal from the aforementioned clubs, FC Rouen, AS Beauvais, and US Luzenac had their appeals overturned meaning they will remain in the Championnat National. Some clubs were, however, unsuccessful. FC Sète's appeal was upheld relegating them to the Division d'Honneur. Stade Plabennecois will replace them in the Championnat National. FC Libourne Saint-Seurin, Besançon RC, and Calais RUFC appeals were also rejected by the DNCG, however, all three clubs have decided to take their case to the CNOSF, the National Sporting Committee of France which governs sport in France. Both Calais and Besançon's rulings were determined on 23 July. The CNOSF determined that Besançon should be relegated to the CFA and not CFA 2, while Calais should respect and oblige the DNCG's ruling relegated them to CFA 2.

Libourne's ruling was determined on 27 July, when the CNOSF informed the club that they should honour the DNCG's ruling and suffer relegation to the CFA. Libourne's chairman Bernard Layda responded by announcing the club will file for bankruptcy, restructure the club, and oblige the ruling. Besançon and Libourne were replaced by ES Fréjus and AS Moulins.

Both CS Louhans-Cuiseaux and SO Cassis Carnoux had their appeals heard by the DNCG on 9 July. On 10 July, the DNGC ruled that both Louhans-Cuiseaux and Cassis-Carnoux rulings had been overturned meaning they will play in the Championnat National this season.

== League table ==
Pos	Team	Pld	W	D	L	GF	GA	GD	Pts	Promotion or Relegation
1	Évian (C, P)	38	26	7	5	64	26	+38	85	Promotion to Ligue 2
2	Reims (P)	38	21	8	9	63	31	+32	71	Promotion to Ligue 2
3	Troyes (P)	38	18	15	5	61	31	+30	69	Promotion to Ligue 2
4	Créteil	38	19	6	13	48	37	+11	63	
5	Pacy Vallée-d'Eure	38	17	9	12	60	41	+19	60	
6	Paris	38	16	10	12	50	44	+6	58	
7	Beauvais	38	15	11	12	50	48	+2	56	
8	Fréjus	38	14	12	12	44	34	+10	54	
9	Cannes	38	13	15	10	37	34	+3	54	
10	Luzenac	38	15	8	15	51	48	+3	53	
11	Amiens	38	14	9	15	55	54	+1	51	
12	Rouen	38	12	14	12	47	43	+4	50	
13	Bayonne	38	13	11	14	41	47	−6	50	
14	Plabennec	38	13	11	14	41	57	−16	50	
15	Rodez	38	12	9	17	42	45	−3	45	
16	Gueugnon	38	11	9	18	41	48	−7	42	
17	Moulins (R)	38	9	11	18	37	57	−20	38	Relegation to Championnat de France amateur
18	Hyères (R)	38	7	14	17	34	55	−21	35	Relegation to Championnat de France amateur
19	Cassis (R, D, R)	38	8	9	21	39	61	−22	33	Banned from all leagues indefinitely.
20	Louhans-Cuiseaux (Note: Louhans-Cuiseaux were docked 5 points due to financial irregularities as a result of players not being paid their wages.) (R)	38	5	6	27	18	85	−67	16	Relegation to Championnat de France amateur

Source: National
Rules for classification: 1) points; 2) goal difference; 3) number of goals scored.
(C) Champions; (D) Disqualified; (P) Promoted; (R) Relegated

== Results ==
Home \ Away	AMI	BAY	BEA	CAN	CAS	CRE	EVI	FRE	GUE	HYR	LCX	LUZ	MOU	PVE	PAR	PLA	REI	ROD	ROU	TRO
Amiens		0–1	2–1	0–1	1–0	4–2	0–0	2–1	0–0	3–0	8–1	2–2	3–1	1–2	2–1	5–1	0–1	2–1	0–0	0–0
Bayonne	2–0		1–2	0–1	2–0	1–1	0–1	0–0	3–1	0–0	3–0	2–2	4–0	1–1	2–0	2–1	0–3	0–1	4–2	0–0
Beauvais	4–1	2–2		3–2	4–0	1–0	1–4	1–1	2–1	2–1	0–0	4–1	0–0	0–1	1–1	2–1	2–0	2–0	1–1	2–2
Cannes	2–2	3–0	2–0		1–0	0–1	0–0	1–1	0–1	0–1	2–0	2–1	1–1	0–0	2–1	0–0	0–0	2–1	3–1	0–0
Cassis	1–2	1–1	0–1	1–0		0–1	1–3	1–1	3–1	1–0	2–0	3–3	1–2	2–3	1–1	1–1	1–2	0–0	4–0	1–2
Créteil	1–0	2–1	3–0	1–0	2–1		0–1	1–1	1–0	1–1	2–0	3–0	3–1	4–1	1–0	0–0	0–1	0–2	0–1	1–1
Évian	1–0	5–0	1–0	3–0	1–0	3–0		1–0	3–1	4–1	3–0	2–0	1–1	2–1	0–1	5–2	2–1	1–0	1–1	1–1
Fréjus	2–4	3–0	0–1	0–1	2–1	1–0	3–1		2–0	1–1	0–1	3–0	1–1	1–2	3–0	0–0	2–0	1–1	2–0	2–2
Gueugnon	2–0	4–0	1–0	3–3	3–0	0–2	0–1	0–1		2–0	3–0	2–0	0–1	1–3	2–0	0–0	0–2	4–3	1–0	1–2
Hyères	2–2	1–1	1–1	2–1	1–2	0–4	0–2	2–0	1–1		1–2	0–2	2–0	1–3	0–0	2–2	3–1	1–1	2–1	2–3
Louhans-Cuiseaux	0–0	1–4	1–2	0–0	2–0	0–2	0–2	2–2	0–0	0–1		1–2	0–3	0–6	0–0	1–3	0–2	3–2	0–2	0–5
Luzenac	1–0	0–1	2–1	0–1	0–2	4–1	1–1	0–1	2–0	4–0	5–0		3–0	2–1	0–0	3–1	0–2	2–1	2–2	1–1
Moulins	2–2	0–2	1–3	0–1	1–1	1–0	1–0	1–2	0–0	1–0	0–2	0–2		0–3	3–1	1–1	1–1	2–0	2–2	1–1
Pacy Vallée-d'Eure	6–0	0–0	1–1	3–0	5–2	1–2	1–1	1–0	1–0	0–0	2–0	0–1	3–0		1–1	2–1	0–2	2–1	0–1	1–1
Paris	2–1	2–0	0–0	1–1	2–3	2–1	3–1	0–0	2–0	2–1	2–0	2–0	1–5	2–0		4–2	1–2	4–2	2–1	2–2
Plabennec	0–3	0–1	3–1	1–1	2–1	2–0	0–1	1–0	2–0	0–0	1–0	0–0	2–0	2–1	0–3		0–4	2–1	1–0	3–0
Reims	5–0	1–0	3–0	0–0	5–0	1–2	0–1	0–1	2–2	1–1	2–0	4–2	3–2	4–1	2–1	1–2		3–0	1–1	1–0
Rodez	1–2	2–0	2–1	2–0	1–1	0–1	0–1	1–0	1–1	0–0	2–1	1–0	1–0	1–1	0–1	3–1	2–0		1–0	1–2
Rouen	3–1	4–0	1–1	1–1	0–0	1–1	1–3	2–1	1–1	2–0	7–0	0–1	2–1	1–0	0–3	0–0	0–0	1–1		2–0
Troyes	1–0	0–0	4–0	2–2	2–0	2–1	4–0	1–2	3–1	2–0	2–0	1–0	2–0	2–0	1–0	5–0	0–0	1–1	1–2	

Source: Championnat National
Legend: Blue = home team win; Yellow = draw; Red = away team win.

== Stats ==
=== Top goalscorers ===
Position	Player	Club	Goals
1	Cédric Fauré	Reims	25
2	Yassin El Azzouzi	Pacy Vallée-d'Eure	23
3	David Pollet	Paris	22
4	Tristan M'Bongo	Luzenac	18
5	Mathieu Duhamel	Créteil	17
-	Jérôme Lafourcade	Troyes	17

Source: FootNational

== Stadia ==
Location of teams in Championnat National 2009–10

Last updated: 7 April 2010

Team	Stadium	Capacity	Avg. attendance
Amiens	Stade de la Licorne	12,097	5,743
Bayonne	Stade Didier Deschamps	3,500	913
Beauvais	Stade Pierre Brisson	10,178	1,646
Cannes	Stade Pierre de Coubertin	12,800	1,977
Cassis	Stade Marcel Cerdan	2,000	227
Créteil	Stade Dominique Duvauchelle	12,150	695
Évian	Stade Joseph-Moynat	6,000	1,640
Fréjus	Stade Pourcin	2,500	1,900
Gueugnon	Stade Jean Laville	13,800	1,584
Hyères	Stade Perruc	1,410	656
Louhans-Cuiseaux	Stade du Bram	10,000	767
Luzenac	Stade Paul Fédou	1,000	704
Moulins	Stade Hector Rolland	2,800	1,173
Pacy Vallée-d'Eure	Stade Pacy-Ménilles	2,000	609
Paris FC	Stade Sébastien Charléty	20,000	371
Plabennec	Stade de Kervéguen	5,000	1,225
Reims	Stade Auguste Delaune II	21,668	7,649
Rodez	Stade Paul Lignon	6,000	2,075
Rouen	Stade Robert Diochon	10,000	3,430
Troyes	Stade de l'Aube	21,877	5,974

== Managerial changes ==
=== During summer break ===
Team	Outgoing	Manner	Date	Table	Incoming	Date	Table
Cannes	Patrice Carteron	Sacked	29 May 2009	Off-season	Albert Emon	1 July 2009	N/A
Reims	Luis Fernandez	Sacked	12 June 2009	Off-season	Marc Collat	1 July 2009	N/A
Troyes	Claude Robin	Sacked	4 June 2009	Off-season	Patrick Remy	1 July 2009	N/A
Amiens	Thierry Laurey	Sacked	10 June 2009	Off-season	Serge Romano	1 July 2009	N/A

==== In season ====
Team	Outgoing	Manner	Date	Table	Incoming	Date	Table
Évian	Stéphane Paille	Sacked	15 January 2010	1st	Bernard Casoni	20 January 2010	1st
