= 2001–02 Le Havre AC season =

Season of a football league in France

Le Havre AC
2001–02 season
- Stadium: Stade Jules Deschaseaux
- French Division 2: 4th
- Coupe de France: Round of 64
- Coupe de la Ligue: Round of 16

The 2001–02 season was the 130th season in the existence of Le Havre AC and the club's third consecutive season in the second division of French football. In addition to the domestic league, Le Havre AC competed in this season's edition of the Coupe de France and Coupe de la Ligue. The season covered the period from 1 July 2001 to 30 June 2002.

== Players ==
=== First-team squad ===
Note: Flags indicate national team as defined under FIFA eligibility rules; some limited exceptions apply. Players may hold more than one non-FIFA nationality.

No.	Pos.	Nation	Player
—	GK	(Slovakia) SVK	Alexander Vencel
—	DF	(Senegal) SEN	Souleymane Diawara
—	DF	(France) FRA	Léonard Mendy
—	DF	(France) FRA	Jérémy Hénin
—	DF	(France) FRA	Eric Deloumeaux
—	DF	(France) FRA	Cyril Guyot
—	DF	(France) FRA	Adama Soumaré
—	DF	(France) FRA	Laurent Ciechelski
—	DF	(France) FRA	Pascal Chimbonda
—	DF	(France) FRA	Thomas Lecossais
—	MF	(Algeria) ALG	Mamar Mamouni
—	MF	(France) FRA	Alexis Bertin
—	MF	(Algeria) ALG	Yazid Mansouri
—	MF	(Algeria) ALG	Fadhil Mohamed Brahami

No.	Pos.	Nation	Player
—	MF	(Morocco) MAR	Jamel Aït Ben Idir
—	MF	(Algeria) ALG	Karim Kerkar
—	MF	(France) FRA	Jean-Michel Lesage
—	MF	(France) FRA	David Martot
—	MF	(France) FRA	Thierry De Neef
—	MF	(Cameroon) CMR	Jean-Jacques Ebentsi
—	MF	(France) FRA	Alain Caveglia
—	MF	(France) FRA	William Mocquet
—	FW	(France) FRA	Thomas Deniaud
—	FW	(France) FRA	Florent Sinama-Pongolle
—	FW	(France) FRA	Patrick Revelles
—	FW	(France) FRA	Anthony Le Tallec
—	FW	(France) FRA	Benoît Le Bris
—	FW	(France) FRA	William Correa

== Competitions ==
Win Draw Loss

=== Overall record ===
Competition	First match	Last match	Starting round	Final position	Record							
Competition	First match	Last match	Starting round	Final position	Pld	W	D	L	GF	GA	GD	Win %
Division 2	August 2001	May 2002	Matchday 1	4th	38	17	14	7	56	32	+24	44.74
Coupe de France	November 2001	TBD	Seventh round	Round of 64	3	2	1	0	3	1	+2	66.67
Coupe de la Ligue	September 2001	January 2002	First round	Round of 16	3	2	0	1	3	3	+0	66.67
Total					44	21	15	8	62	36	+26	47.73

Source: Competitions

=== French Division 2 ===
==== League table ====
Pos	Team	Pld	W	D	L	GF	GA	GD	Pts	Promotion or Relegation
2	Strasbourg (P)	38	19	11	8	47	27	+20	68	Promotion to Ligue 1
3	Nice (P)	38	20	6	12	56	40	+16	66	Promotion to Ligue 1
4	Le Havre (P)	38	17	14	7	56	32	+24	65	Promotion to Ligue 1
5	Le Mans	38	16	10	12	48	41	+7	58	
6	Caen	38	16	10	12	59	55	+4	58	

Source: Ligue 2
(P) Promoted

==== Results summary ====
Overall								Home						Away					
Pld	W	D	L	GF	GA	GD	Pts	W	D	L	GF	GA	GD	W	D	L	GF	GA	GD
38	17	14	7	56	32	+24	65	13	5	1	38	9	+29	4	9	6	18	23	−5

Source: Ligue 2

==== Results by round ====
Round	1	2	3	4	5	6	7	8	9	10	11	12	13	14	15	16	17	18	19	20	21	22	23	24	25	26	27	28	29	30	31	32	33	34	35	36	37	38
Ground	H	A	H	A	H	A	H	A	H	A	H	A	H	A	H	A	A	H	A	H	A	H	A	H	A	H	A	H	A	H	A	H	A	H	H	A	H	A
Result	D	D	D	D	W	L	D	D	W	D	W	W	W	D	W	L	W	W	D	W	D	W	L	W	D	W	L	W	D	D	L	W	W	L	D	W	W	L
Position	9	12	11	11	8	11	11	10	9	8	6	7	4	5	4	5	4	4	4	2	4	4	4	4	4	3	3	1	3	3	3	2	2	2	2	2	2	4

Source: Ligue 2
A = Away; H = Home; W = Win; D = Draw; L = Loss

==== Matches ====
29 July 2001 1	Le Havre	1–1	Strasbourg	Le Havre
--:-- CEST (UTC+2)				Stadium: Stade Jules Deschaseaux

4 August 2001 2	Niort	2–2	Le Havre	Niort
--:-- CEST (UTC+2)				Stadium: Stade René Gaillard

10 August 2001 3	Le Havre	0–0	Nancy	Le Havre
--:-- CEST (UTC+2)				Stadium: Stade Jules Deschaseaux

18 August 2001 4	Nîmes	0–0	Le Havre	Nîmes
--:-- CEST (UTC+2)				Stadium: Stade des Costières

25 August 2001 5	Le Havre	4–0	Grenoble	Le Havre
--:-- CEST (UTC+2)				Stadium: Stade Jules Deschaseaux

29 August 2001 6	Châteauroux	4–2	Le Havre	Châteauroux
--:-- CEST (UTC+2)				Stadium: Stade Gaston-Petit

8 September 2001 7	Le Havre	0–0	Beauvais	Le Havre
--:-- CEST (UTC+2)				Stadium: Stade Jules Deschaseaux

15 September 2001 8	Créteil	0–0	Le Havre	Créteil
--:-- CEST (UTC+2)				Stadium: Stade Dominique Duvauchelle

22 September 2001 9	Le Havre	3–0	Le Mans	Le Havre
--:-- CEST (UTC+2)				Stadium: Stade Jules Deschaseaux

29 September 2001 10	Caen	0–0	Le Havre	Caen
--:-- CEST (UTC+2)				Stadium: Stade Michel d'Ornano

5 October 2001 11	Le Havre	1–0	Wasquehal	Le Havre
--:-- CEST (UTC+2)				Stadium: Stade Jules Deschaseaux

13 October 2001 12	Saint-Étienne	0–1	Le Havre	Saint-Étienne
--:-- CEST (UTC+2)				Stadium: Stade Geoffroy-Guichard

20 October 2001 13	Le Havre	2–1	Amiens	Le Havre
--:-- CEST (UTC+2)				Stadium: Stade Jules Deschaseaux

27 October 2001 14	Gueugnon	1–1	Le Havre	Gueugnon
--:-- CEST (UTC+2)				Stadium: Stade Jean Laville

9 November 2001 15	Le Havre	5–0	Martigues	Le Havre
--:-- CEST (UTC+2)				Stadium: Stade Jules Deschaseaux

13 November 2001 16	Ajaccio	3–0	Le Havre	Ajaccio
--:-- CEST (UTC+2)				Stadium: Stade François Coty

17 November 2001 17	Nice	0–1	Le Havre	Nice
--:-- CEST (UTC+2)				Stadium: Stade du Ray

28 November 2001 18	Le Havre	2–0	Istres	Le Havre
--:-- CEST (UTC+2)				Stadium: Stade Jules Deschaseaux

8 December 2001 19	Laval	1–1	Le Havre	Laval
--:-- CEST (UTC+2)				Stadium: Stade Francis Le Basser

19 December 2001 20	Le Havre	2–0	Niort	Le Havre
--:-- CEST (UTC+2)				Stadium: Stade Jules Deschaseaux

12 January 2002 23	Grenoble	1–0	Le Havre	Grenoble
--:-- CEST (UTC+2)				Stadium: Stade Lesdiguières

23 January 2002 24	Le Havre	3–1	Châteauroux	Le Havre
--:-- CEST (UTC+2)				Stadium: Stade Jules Deschaseaux

26 January 2002 22	Le Havre	3–0	Nîmes	Le Havre
--:-- CEST (UTC+2)				Stadium: Stade Jules Deschaseaux

29 January 2002 25	Beauvais	1–1	Le Havre	Beauvais
--:-- CEST (UTC+2)				Stadium: Stade Pierre Brisson

2 February 2002 26	Le Havre	3–1	Créteil	Le Havre
--:-- CEST (UTC+2)				Stadium: Stade Jules Deschaseaux

5 February 2002 27	Le Mans	2–0	Le Havre	Le Mans
--:-- CEST (UTC+2)				Stadium: Stade Léon-Bollée

12 February 2002 28	Le Havre	2–1	Caen	Le Havre
--:-- CEST (UTC+2)				Stadium: Stade Jules Deschaseaux

16 February 2002 29	Wasquehal	2–2	Le Havre	Villeneuve-d'Ascq
--:-- CEST (UTC+2)				Stadium: Stadium Lille Métropole

23 February 2002 30	Le Havre	0–0	Saint-Étienne	Le Havre
--:-- CEST (UTC+2)				Stadium: Stade Jules Deschaseaux

2 March 2002 21	Nancy	1–1	Le Havre	Tomblaine
--:-- CEST (UTC+2)				Stadium: Stade Marcel Picot

7 March 2002 31	Amiens	2–0	Le Havre	Amiens
--:-- CEST (UTC+2)				Stadium: Stade de la Licorne

16 March 2002 32	Le Havre	2–1	Gueugnon	Le Havre
--:-- CEST (UTC+2)				Stadium: Stade Jules Deschaseaux

22 March 2002 33	Martigues	1–3	Le Havre	Martigues
--:-- CEST (UTC+2)				Stadium: Stade Francis Turcan

26 March 2002 34	Le Havre	0–1	Ajaccio	Le Havre
--:-- CEST (UTC+2)				Stadium: Stade Jules Deschaseaux

6 April 2002 35	Le Havre	1–1	Nice	Le Havre
--:-- CEST (UTC+2)				Stadium: Stade Jules Deschaseaux

13 April 2002 36	Istres	1–3	Le Havre	Istres
--:-- CEST (UTC+2)				Stadium: Stade Bernard Bardin

26 April 2002 37	Le Havre	4–1	Laval	Le Havre
--:-- CEST (UTC+2)				Stadium: Stade Jules Deschaseaux

3 May 2002 38	Strasbourg	1–0	Le Havre	Strasbourg
--:-- CEST (UTC+2)				Stadium: Stade de la Meinau

=== Coupe de la Ligue ===
1 September 2001 First round	Le Havre	2–1	Wasquehal	Le Havre
--:-- CEST (UTC+2)				Stadium: Stade Jules-Deschaseaux; Attendance: 4,137; Referee: Thierry Desessart

1 December 2001 Round of 32	CS Louhans-Cuiseaux	0–1	Le Havre	Louhans
--:-- CET (UTC+1)			Deniaud 7'	Stadium: Parc des Sports du Bram; Attendance: 1,881; Referee: Hervé Piccirillo

8 January 2002 Round of 16	Rennes	2–0	Le Havre	Rennes
--:-- CET (UTC+1)				Stadium: Stade de la Route de Lorient; Attendance: 9,123; Referee: Said Ennjimi

== Statistics ==
=== Squad statistics ===
No.	Pos	Nat	Player	Total		Division 2		Coupe de France		Coupe de la Ligue	
No.	Pos	Nat	Player	Apps	Goals	Apps	Goals	Apps	Goals	Apps	Goals
Goalkeepers
1	GK	(France) FRA		0	0	0	0	0	0	0	0
1	GK	(France) FRA		0	0	0	0	0	0	0	0
Defenders
1	DF	(France) FRA		0	0	0	0	0	0	0	0
1	DF	(France) FRA		0	0	0	0	0	0	0	0
Midfielders
1	MF	(France) FRA		0	0	0	0	0	0	0	0
1	MF	(France) FRA		0	0	0	0	0	0	0	0
Forwards
1	FW	(France) FRA		0	0	0	0	0	0	0	0
1	FW	(France) FRA		0	0	0	0	0	0	0	0
Players who have made an appearance or had a squad number this season but have left the club
1	GK	(France) FRA		0	0	0	0	0	0	0	0

=== Goalscorers ===
Rank	No.	Pos	Nat	Name	Division 2	Coupe de France	Coupe de la Ligue	Total	
1	1	FW	(France)		0	0	0	0	
2	2	MF	(France)		0	0	0	0	
2	Totals					0	0	0	0
