= IDEC =

IDEC may refer to:

- Biogen Idec, a biotechnology company
- IDEC Corporation, a Japanese manufacturer of automation and control products
- International Democratic Education Conference, an annual academic and youth conference
- Toralizumab (IDEC 131), an antibody and an immunosuppressive drug
- IDEC Sport Racing, a French auto racing team
- The sponsor name given to ocean racing trimarans skippered by French yachtsman Francis Joyon:
  - IDEC-1, a 75ft trimaran built in 1985
  - IDEC 2, a 97ft trimaran built in 2007
  - IDEC 3, a 103ft trimaran built in 2006
