= Franck Escalon =

French footballer (born 1973)

Personal information
- Date of birth: July 27, 1973 (age 53)
- Place of birth: France
- Positions: Midfielder; forward

Senior career*
Years	Team	Apps	(Gls)
- Louhans-Cuiseaux FC
1997	Berwick Rangers F.C.	7	(2)
1997–2001	Ross County F.C.	75	(3)
- * Club domestic league appearances and goals

Franck Escalon (born 27 July 1973 in France) is a French retired footballer who now works as a cycling manager and sports therapist at Ponent Mar Hotel in Spain.

== Career ==
Escalon started his senior career with Louhans-Cuiseaux in the 1990s. In 1997, he signed for Ross County in the Scottish Football League Third Division, where he made sixty-nine appearances and scored three goals before retiring in 2001.
