= Mathlouthi =

Mathlouthi (Arabic: المثلوثي) is a Tunisian surname which is – without the Arabic definite article Al-/El- – also common among the Tunisians in France. Notable people with this family name include:

- Ahmed Mathlouthi (born 1989), Tunisian swimmer
- Ali Mathlouthi (born 1987), French-Tunisian footballer
- Aymen Mathlouthi (born 1984), Tunisian footballer
- Emel Mathlouthi (born 1982), Tunisian singer-songwriter
- Hamza Mathlouthi (born 1992), Tunisian footballer
- Maroua Mathlouthi (born 1988), Tunisian swimmer
