= Dutil =

Dutil is a French toponymic surname. Notable people with the surname include:

- Grégory Dutil (born 1980), French professional footballer
- Marcel Dutil (born 1942), Canadian businessman
- Muriel Dutil (born 1944), Quebecer actress
- Robert Dutil (born 1950), Canadian businessman and politician
- Yvan Dutil (born 1970), Canadian astrophysicist
