= Gaby Robert =

French footballer and manager (1920-2003)

Personal information
- Full name: Gabriel Robert
- Date of birth: 5 March 1920
- Place of birth: Belcodène, Bouches-du-Rhône, France
- Date of death: 15 May 2003 (aged 83)
- Place of death: Hyères, Var, France
- Position: Midfielder

Senior career*
Years	Team	Apps	(Gls)
1945–1946	Annecy		
1946–1947	Racing Club de Paris		
1947–1953	Hyères FC		
1953–1958	Toulon	58	(15)

International career
1948	France Olympic	2	(0)

Managerial career
- 19??–1953: Hyères FC
- 1953–1959: Toulon
- 1959–1961: Lyon
- 1961–1966: Hyères FC
- 1966: France Amateurs
- 1966–1970: Valenciennes
- 1976: France Olympic
- * Club domestic league appearances and goals

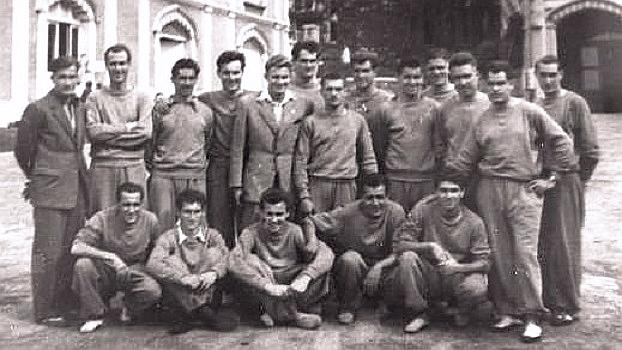
Picture of Olympique Team France of soccer in 1948, before Olympic Games

Gabriel "Gaby" Robert (5 March 1920 – 15 May 2003) was a French football player and coach. He played for the France Olympic team at the 1948 Summer Olympics.

After his playing career, he became a coach with Hyères FC, Toulon, Lyon, Valenciennes and coached France at the 1976 Summer Olympics.

== Club career ==
Robert played for Annecy in 1945–1946, Racing Club Paris in 1946–1947, Hyères FC and Sporting Club Toulon.

== International career ==
Robert was selected in France Football squad for the 1948 Summer Olympics, and played France two games against India and Great Britain, as France were eliminated in the Quarterfinals. He never had a cap with France senior team.

== Coaching career ==
In 1966 Robert coached France national Amateurs team.

In 1976 he managed France at the 1976 Olympic Football Tournament, as France was eliminated in the quarterfinals by East Germany.

He thus became the first French, and to date the only, to participate to the Olympic Football Tournament as both a player and a manager.

== Personal life and death ==
Robert was born in Belcodène on 5 March 1920. He died in Hyères on 15 May 2003.
