= Clément Rigaud =

French footballer (born 1984)

Personal information
- Full name: Clément Rigaud
- Date of birth: 26 September 1984 (age 42)
- Place of birth: Paris, France
- Height: 1.88 m (6 ft 2 in)
- Position: Goalkeeper

Youth career
- 1988–1995: Perrigny
- 1995–1999: Lons-le-Saunier
- 1999–2001: Louhans-Cuiseaux

Senior career*
Years	Team	Apps	(Gls)
2001–2003	Louhans-Cuiseaux	0	(0)
2003–2004	Guingamp	0	(0)
2004–2006	Gap	49	(0)
2006–2007	Stade Reims	0	(0)
2007–2008	Albi	34	(0)
2008–2009	Chambéry	0	(0)
2009–2011	Gap	51	(0)
2011–2012	Fréjus Saint-Raphaël	0	(0)
- * Club domestic league appearances and goals as of 4 July 2012

Clément Rigaud (born 26 September 1984) is a French football player who currently plays as a goalkeeper. He serves as captain of the club and formerly has stints with professional clubs Guingamp, Stade Reims, and Louhans-Cuiseaux, though the latter club is currently no longer professional. Rigaud failed to make an appearance with Guingamp or Louhans-Cuiseaux, but did appear in two Coupe de France matches, while playing with Reims. Rigaud is in his second stint with Gap having spent two seasons with the club through 2004–2006.
