= Azzedine Meguellatti =

French sports coach (1960-2024)

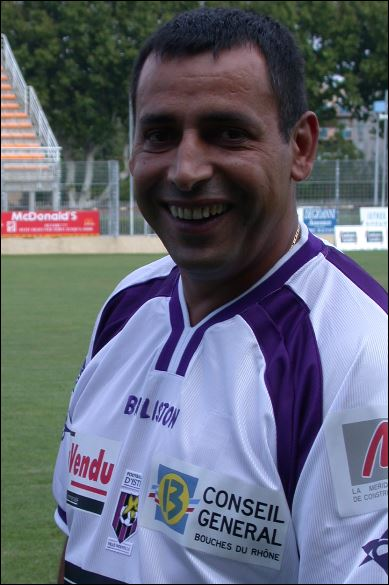
Meguellatti with Istres in 2002

Azzedine Meguellatti (5 October 1960 – 12 January 2024) was a French football manager. He managed as high as Ligue 2, where he led Istres from 2002 to 2003.

== Biography ==
Born in Saint-Denis in the outskirts of Paris, Meguellatti played for local Pierrefitte F.C. and FCM Aubervilliers, and captained FC Saint-Leu. He joined CS Ermont as manager in 1989, with the team in the second district league, leading them to four promotions to reach the sixth-tier Régional 1 by 1997.

In 2002 Meguellatti was the surprise appointment at FC Istres in Ligue 2, keeping them in the league for both of his seasons. The move was particularly unusual as he never obtained a Brevet d'État d'éducateur sportif to teach a sport to professional standards. After preserving the Bouches-du-Rhône club's league status twice, in July 2003 he returned to his native department of Seine-Saint-Denis and joined Red Star F.C. in the Régional 1. He then managed AS Poissy (2004–2006; fourth-tier CFA), and in 2009–10 he gave a senior debut at UJA Alfortville to former futsal player Wissam Ben Yedder, who would go on to play for France. When Ben Yedder transferred to Toulouse FC after helping UJA to a first-ever promotion to the Championnat National, Meguellatti became a scout for Toulouse in the Île-de-France region.

In July 2010, Meguellatti was hired at Racing Club de France Football who had been relegated to the CFA 2 (fifth tier), serving as head coach and general manager. In November, he returned to UJA while remaining at Racing, thus becoming the only person to lead two French clubs in national divisions at the same time; on 28 November he travelled to Corsica for UJA's 1–1 draw away to leaders S.C. Bastia and the following day his Racing team won 2–0 at home to SC Douai.

After Racing were relegated to the Régional 1 in 2013, Meguellatti resigned but remained as general manager until 2018. He died on 12 January 2024, aged 63, in Seraincourt, Val-d'Oise.
