= Hyères FC =

French football club

- Full name: Hyères Football Club
- Founded: 1912; 114 years ago
- Ground: Stade Perruc; Hyères; France
- Capacity: 1,410
- Owner: Mourad Boudjellal
- President: Mourad Boudjellal
- Manager: Lilian Compan
- League: National 1 Group A
- 2024–25: National 2 Group A, 5th
- Website: https://hyeresfootballclub.footeo.com
Home colours	Away colours

Hyères Football Club is a French association football team playing in the city of Hyères, Var. The club was founded in 1912 and played the first ever season of professional football in France in 1932–1933 but were relegated. Currently the club plays at an amateur level, in Championnat National 1, the fourth tier of French football.

== History ==
Hyères Football Club was founded on 21 November 1911 with the separation of the football and cycling sections of Vélosport Hyerois. In September 1919 it became a member of the French Football Federation, formed earlier in the year. In 1932 president Barthélemy Perruc led the club into the first season of professional football in France. They were relegated from the Division after just one year, and a year after that the club gave up their professional status.

In 1941 the club reached the semi-final of the wartime Non-occupied zone of the Coupe de France, eliminating Marseille in the quarter-final.

In 1950 the club were champions of the Championnat de France Amateur, which was the third tier of French football, and the highest level of amateur football, at the time. The club spent the next thirty years moving between this level and the regional level below.

In 1978 the club won promotion to the newly created National Division 4, and two years later reached National Division 3 where they remained for seven seasons until relegation in 1988. They remained in National Division 4 until the FFF reorganised the leagues in 1993, when they placed in the new Championnat National 3, now the fifth tier. In 1998 they gained promotion from what was now Championnat de France Amateur 2 to Championnat de France Amateur, lasting at this level until 2003.

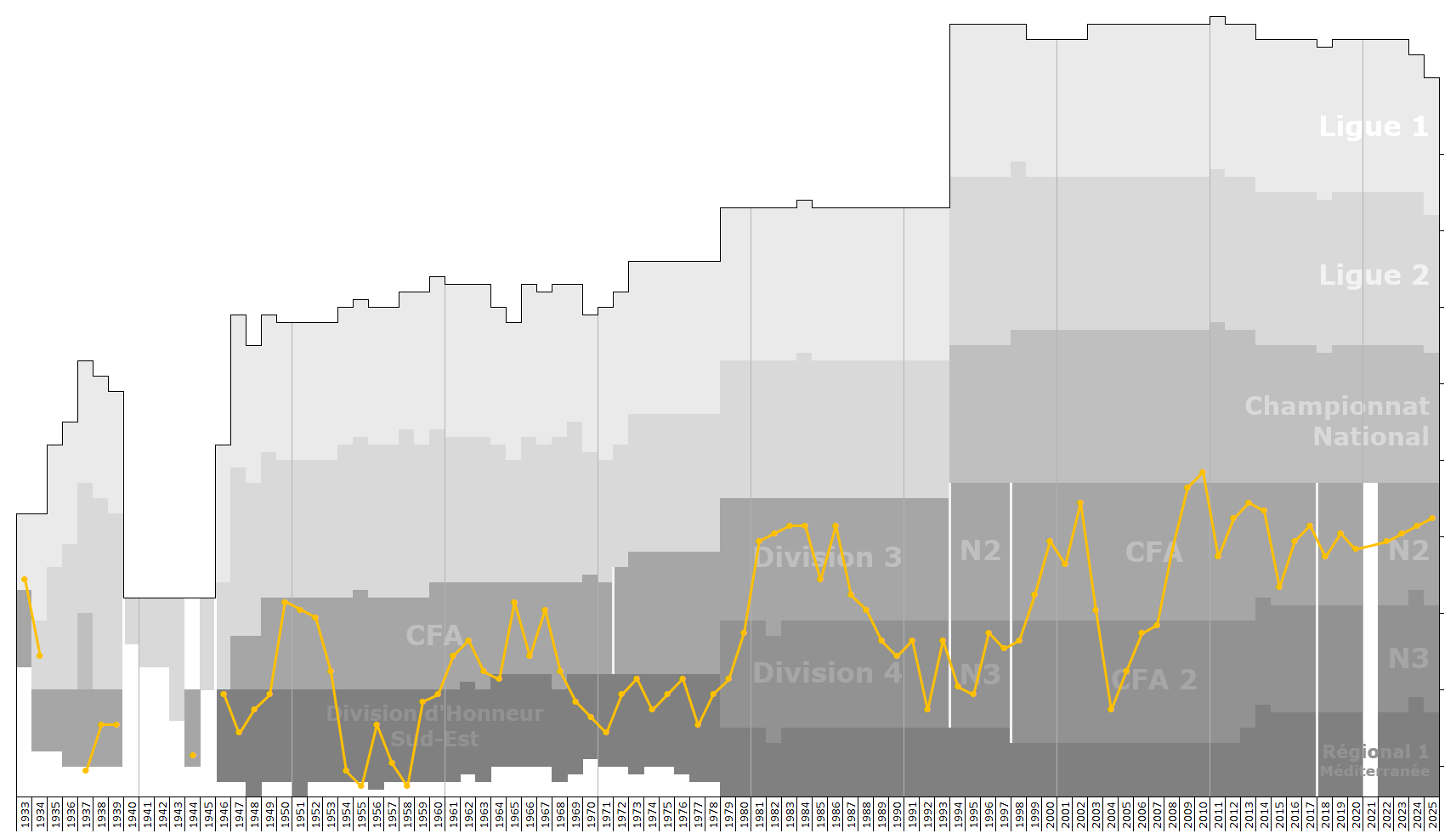
Historical league performance chart of Hyères FC

In 2006 the club were promoted from the CFA2 as both champion of group D and overall champion, and in 2009 were promoted from the CFA as champions of group B. They were relegated from Championnat National in the first season and since then have remained in CFA, now called Championnat National 2.

On 2 February 2021, the club was bought by Mourad Boudjellal, after his attempt to buy Marseille and Toulon failed. A day later Nicolas Anelka became the clubs sporting director. Anelka announced his departure three months later, on 4 May 2021, with no first team game taking place during his tenure, due to the COVID-19 pandemic in France.

== Current squad ==
As of 10 April, 2026

Note: Flags indicate national team as defined under FIFA eligibility rules; some limited exceptions apply. Players may hold more than one non-FIFA nationality.

No.	Pos.	Nation	Player
1	GK	FRA	Florian Andreani
2	DF	FRA	Valentin Hoguet
3	DF	FRA	Yann Djabou
4	DF	FRA	Moussa Kouyaté
5	DF	FRA	Mamadou Savane
6	MF	FRA	Eric Mathieu
8	MF	FRA	Richie Dilemfu
10	FW	FRA	Yohan Brun
11	FW	FRA	Ibrahim Fofana
12	MF	CMR	Tyrone Sakho
17	DF	FRA	Hugues Daniel

No.	Pos.	Nation	Player
18	MF	FRA	Arnaud Buisson
19	DF	FRA	Youssef Gazzaoui
20	MF	FRA	Axel Tressens
21	FW	FRA	Abdsamad Aniss
22	MF	FRA	Keny Moulet
23	FW	FRA	Erwan Moutault
29	MF	FRA	Esteban Hari
30	GK	FRA	Florian Verplanck
33	FW	FRA	Dylan Okyere
35	MF	MTN	Sega Keita

== Notable players ==
- (France) Frank Leboeuf (youth)

== Honours ==
- Championnat de France Amateurs : 2009
- Championnat de France Amateurs 2 : 1950, 2007
- Champion DH Sud-Est : 1949
- Champion DH Méditerranée : 1960, 1964
- Runner-up DH Méditerranée : 1973, 1976

== Managerial history ==
- Metha 1930–1931
- Charles Comte 1932–1933
- Friess 1933–1934

?

- Gaby Robert 1941–1953

?

- Gaby Robert 1961–1966
- Henri Pellegrino 1966–1968

?

- Dubernet 1983–1984

?

- Guy Roussel 1987–1988

?

- Patrick Bruzzichessi 1993–2002
- Patrick Decugis 2002–2003
- Patrick Bruzzichessi 2003–2010
- Robert Buigues 2010–2011
- André Blanc 2011–
