= Franck Turpin =

French footballer (born 1977)

Personal information
- Full name: Franck Turpin
- Date of birth: January 27, 1977 (age 49)
- Place of birth: Lille, France
- Height: 1.81 m (5 ft 11 1/2 in)
- Position: Defender

Team information
- Current team: Gap FC

Senior career*
Years	Team	Apps	(Gls)
1994–1998	Lille	2	(0)
1998–1999	Dunkerque	21	(0)
1999–2001	Pau	65	(1)
2001–2002	Calais	21	(0)
2002–2013	Gap	178	(11)
- * Club domestic league appearances and goals as of 1 December 2022

Franck Turpin (born January 27, 1977) is a French former professional football player.

He played on the professional level in Ligue 1 for Lille OSC.
