= Sébastien Larcier =

French footballer (born 1977)

Personal information
- Date of birth: 29 August 1977 (age 49)
- Place of birth: Mont-Saint-Aignan, France
- Height: 1.77 m (5 ft 9 1/2 in)
- Position: Midfielder

Youth career
- Évreux

Senior career*
Years	Team	Apps	(Gls)
1997–2001	Pacy-sur-Eure	114	(1)
2001–2003	Alès	64	(4)
2003–2008	Dijon	157	(8)
Total		335	(13)
- * Club domestic league appearances and goals

Sébastien Larcier (born 29 August 1977) is a French football midfielder.

== Career ==
Born in Mont-Saint-Aignan, Larcier began playing football in Championnat National for Pacy Vallée-d'Eure and Olympique Alès before joining Dijon FCO, where he played four seasons in Ligue 2 as a defensive midfielder.

After his retirement, Larcier continued at Dijon FCO as the head of the recruitment in the club. In July 2016, Larcier was also appointed president of the women's soccer section in Dijon. After 17 years at Dijon, his departure from the club was announced on 18 April 2020.

On 20 April 2020, Larcier was appointed sporting director of Angers SCO. In late November 2021, Larcier was replaced at Angers and left the club, after months of rumors about an exit. Larcier later took Angers to the Labour Court, where he sued the club over the way he had been fired.
