= Mourad Boudjellal =

Algerian businessman

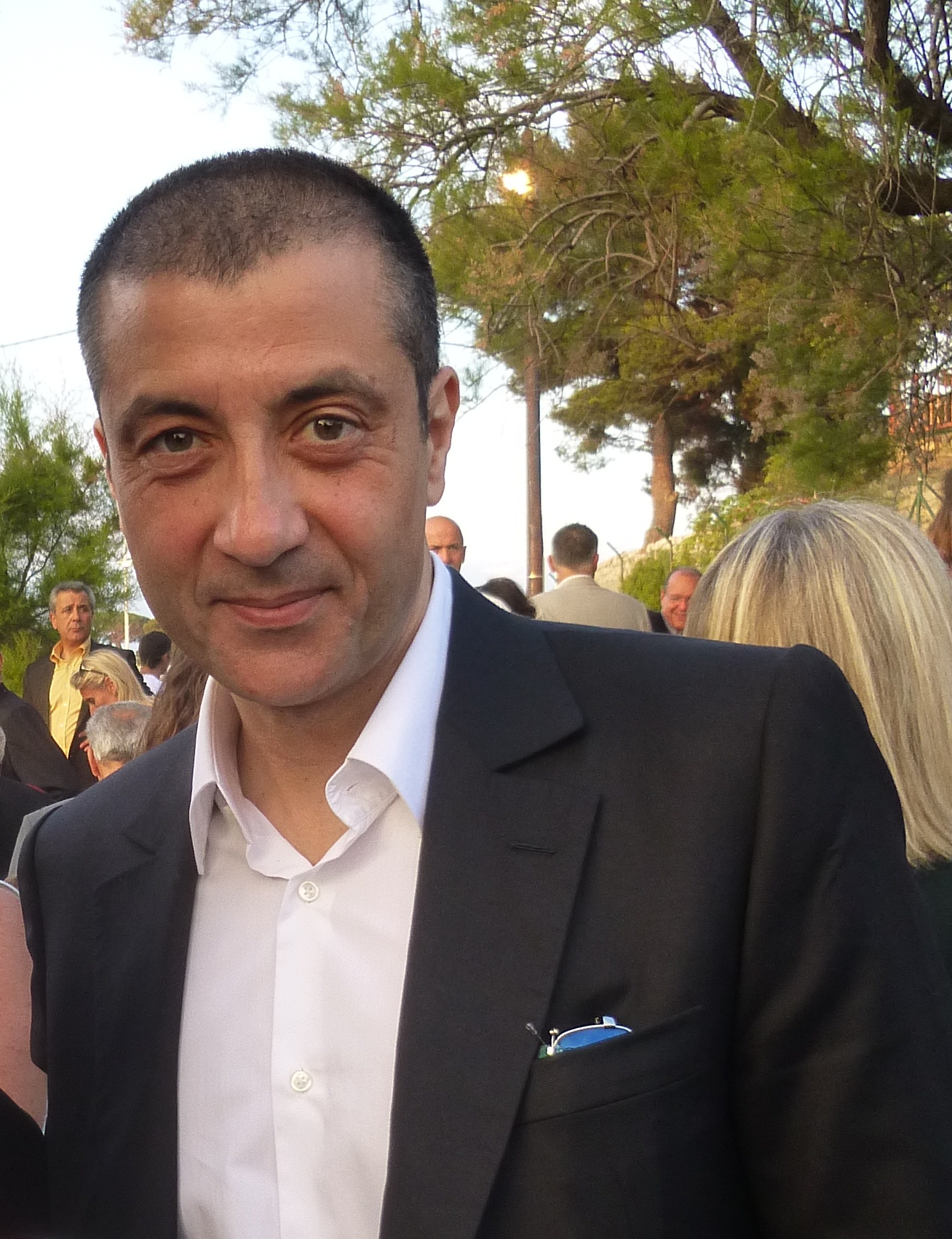
- Boudjellal in 2014
- Born: 5 June 1960 (age 66); Ollioules, France
- Occupation: Businessman
- Known for: President of RC Toulon (2006–2020); Owner of Hyères (2021–present)

Mourad Boudjellal (born 5 June 1960) is a French businessman, founder of Soleil Productions comic publishing and sport manager. He was born in Ollioules, near Toulon, on the French Riviera.

== Presidency of Toulonnais ==
In 2006, Boudjellal brought RC Toulonnais, the rugby team of his hometown, to prominence by bringing in big-name players such as Sonny Bill Williams and Tana Umaga, and later others including Steffon Armitage, Matt Giteau, Mathieu Bastareaud, Bakkies Botha and Jonny Wilkinson. This has led english rugby commentator Martin Gillingham to call Toulon a "band of galacticos" (a reference to Real Madrid's galáctico policy).

His tenure saw tremendous commercial success for the club. ESPN Irish rugby journalist Ian Moriarty remarked during the 2012–13 season:

« Boudjellal claimed earlier this season that the financial performance of the club meant he no longer needs to put his own cash in. Whatever you think about his penchant for throwing verbal grenades in the media from time to time, his management from a commercial point of view has been impressive. Toulon have increased their turnover by 500% during his tenure, allowing the club to spend right up to the limit of the salary cap. »

His time as a leader of TRUC has been "colourful", due to his oftentimes somewhat impetuous behaviour, and use of coarse language. Most notably, he was sentenced to 130-days ban from Top 14 organizer LNR for the following "imaged" outburst after Toulon lost a match against Clermont-Ferrand in January 2012:

« I had my first referee sodomy against Clermont in the semi-finals in 2010. I've just had my second tonight. It's supposed to hurt the first time but it hurts again this time. The images ought to be on YouPorn instead of YouTube. »

== Hyères takeover ==
In February 2021, Boudjellal signed a takeover deal for French fourth division football team Hyères FC. The deal came after failures of long-running attempts to take over Olympique de Marseille and Sporting Club Toulon in 2020.
