= Daouda Jabi =

Guinean footballer

Personal information
- Date of birth: 10 April 1981 (age 45)
- Place of birth: Pelundo, Guinea-Bissau
- Height: 1.80 m (5 ft 11 in)
- Position: Defender

Senior career*
Years	Team	Apps	(Gls)
1997–1998	Pacy Vallée-d'Eure		
1998–2000	Dunkerque	37	(2)
2000–2002	Lens B	59	(2)
2001–2005	Lens	40	(0)
2005–2006	AC Ajaccio	31	(0)
2006–2007	Kayseri Erciyesspor	10	(1)
2007–2008	Trabzonspor	10	(0)

International career
2003–2008	Guinea	24	(1)
- * Club domestic league appearances and goals

Daouda Jabi (born 10 April 1981) is a Guinean former professional footballer who played as a defender.

He began his senior career with Pacy Vallée-d'Eure and USL Dunkerque before moving to RC Lens where he played for the club's reserves and the first team. He spent the 2005–06 season with AC Ajaccio. In his last two seasons he played for Turkish club Kayseri Erciyesspor and Trabzonspor respectively.

Born in Guinea Bissau, Jabi appeared in three matches at the 2006 Africa Cup of Nations finals, helping the Guinea national team reach the quarter-finals.
