= Yohan Brun =

French footballer (born 1994)

Personal information
- Date of birth: 19 September 1994 (age 32)
- Place of birth: Hyères, France
- Height: 1.79 m (5 ft 10 in)
- Position: Forward

Team information
- Current team: Hyères
- Number: 10

Senior career*
Years	Team	Apps	(Gls)
2014–2019	Hyères	85	(22)
2019–2020	Grenoble	19	(1)
2020–2022	Laval	46	(4)
2021	Laval B	2	(0)
2022–2024	Versailles	32	(3)
2024–	Hyères	10	(2)
- * Club domestic league appearances and goals as of 9 November 2024

Yohan Brun (born 19 September 1994) is a French professional footballer who plays as a forward for Championnat National 1 club Hyères.

== Club career ==
On 2 January 2019, Brun joined signed his first professional contract with Grenoble after a successful start of the 2018–19 season with Hyères. He made his professional debut with Grenoble in a 0–0 Ligue 2 tie with Le Havre on 12 December 2019.

In January 2020, Brun was released by Grenoble and signed a two-and-a-half-year contract with Laval. In January 2022, he joined Versailles.

== Honours ==
Versailles

- Championnat National 2: 2021–22
