= Laurent David =

French footballer (born 1971)

Personal information
- Date of birth: 9 January 1971 (age 55)
- Place of birth: Saint-Brieuc, France
- Height: 1.75 m (5 ft 9 in)
- Position: Midfielder

Team information
- Current team: Les Herbiers VF (manager)

Senior career*
Years	Team	Apps	(Gls)
1987–1991	Brest (B team)		
1991–1992	Brest		
1992–1994	Sedan		
1994–1995	Martigues	36	(2)
1995–1998	Mulhouse	109	(20)
1998–1999	Beauvais	36	(4)
1999–2000	Amiens	25	(1)
2000–2003	Grenoble		
2003–2005	Brest		
2005–2011	Plabennec		

Managerial career
- 2012–2013: SC Morlaix
- 2013–2014: Brest youth
- 2014–2021: Brest B
- 2022–: Les Herbiers VF
- * Club domestic league appearances and goals

Laurent David (born 9 January 1971) is a French football manager and former player who manages Les Herbiers VF. A midfielder, he played in Ligue 1 for Martigues and in Ligue 2 for Brest, Sedan, Mulhouse, Beauvais, Amiens and Grenoble.
