= Brevet d'État d'éducateur sportif =

Brevet d'Etat d'éducateur sportif (BEES) (State Certified Sports Instructor) is a French government certificate for sport coaches. Only holders of this certificate may be paid for sports coaching, according to the law of the 16 July 1984, and after that that in the Sport Code, second volume, article L. 212–1). It requires the applicant to be an adult and the holder of the diploma Prévention et secours civiques de niveau 1 (PSC1) (Level 1 civic prevention and first-aid)

== Composition ==
The formation leading to the obtention of the BEES is composed of a common section all sport instructor follow regardless of their future sector, and a specific section.

The common section, which is the one all candidates go through, whether they aim to coach in skying, horse riding or surfing, is an examination on their general sportive knowledge. The specific section is focused on the sports the coach is aiming to teach. It requires a high level in the practice of the chosen sport.

The BEES is divided into 3 levels:

- 1st level of the BEES: Sport instructor, ability to be paid for the activity. It is a level 4 diploma, at baccalaureate level.
- 2nd level of the BEES: Facilitator for instructors, can coach professional sportsmen and women. It is a level 2 diploma (license level), allowing its holder to apply to the competitive examination to become a sports teacher.
- 3rd level of the BEES: Expert in his sport. It is a level I diploma (Master level and over)

The preparation for the diploma is assured by public and private organisms, and the formation is licensed by the regional offices of the Minister of Youth Affairs and Sports. They are often conducted in Centres of ressources, expertise and sportive performance (CREPS in French).

Created in 2001, the Brevet professionnel de la jeunesse, de l'éducation populaire et du sport (BPJEPS) (Certificate of the youth, popular education and sport) is the first step in renovating the diplomas and qualification, in some sports, it replaces the 1st level of the BEES. The diplôme d'État supérieur de la jeunesse, de l’éducation populaire et du sport (DEJEPS) (State diploma of the youth, popular education and sport) and the diplôme d'État supérieur de la jeunesse, de l’éducation populaire et du sport (DESJEPS) (superior State diploma youth, popular education and sport), created in 2006, replace the 2nd level of the BEES in these sports, as well as the diplôme d'État relatif aux fonctions d'animation (DEFA) (State diploma pertaining to animator functions) and the diplôme d'État de directeur de projet d'animation et de développement (DEDPAD) (animation and development project director State diploma). In some sports, like underwater diving, the renovation of the formation is still ongoing: while the BP and DE have been created the first DEJEPS in diving are awarded in 2013, the DES of the sport isn't implemented yet.

== See also ==
- Minister of Youth Affairs and Sports (France)
