= Toralizumab =

Monoclonal antibody

Monoclonal antibody
- Type: Whole antibody
- Source: Humanized (from mouse)
- Target: CD40 ligand

Clinical data
- ATC code: none

Identifiers
- CAS Number: 252662-47-8
- ChemSpider: none
- UNII: KX44A9HM0B
- KEGG: D06193

Toralizumab (IDEC 131) was a humanized monoclonal antibody and an immunosuppressive drug. Possible indications included treatment of antibody-mediated disorders (immune thrombocytopenic purpura, lupus nephritis, rheumatoid arthritis), T-cell-mediated diseases (multiple sclerosis, Crohn's disease, and transplantations such as solid organ transplantation, pancreatic islet cell transplantation, and corneal transplantation), and B-cell malignancies such as CLL/small lymphocytic lymphoma, follicular cell lymphoma grade I or II, marginal zone lymphoma, mantle cell lymphoma, MALT lymphoma, Waldenström's macroglobulinemia, monocytoid B-cell lymphoma; relapsed/refractory Hodgkin's disease).

In Phase II clinical trials regarding multiple sclerosis and Crohn's disease, thromboembolisms occurred in at least three patients. A causal connection could not be proven, but since the same adverse effects were seen in trials with a similar antibody (hu5C8), the trials were halted.

The drug was developed by IDEC Pharmaceuticals Corporation.
