= André Blanc =

French physiotherapist and football manager

Personal information
- Place of birth: France

Managerial career
- Years: Team
- 1942–1943: Marseille

André Blanc was a physiotherapist who became manager of Olympique de Marseille for the 1942–43 season. He won the Coupe de France in this season.
