= Régis Kittler =

French footballer (born 1979)

Personal information
- Full name: Régis Kittler
- Date of birth: 6 October 1979 (age 47)
- Place of birth: Mulhouse, France
- Height: 1.82 m (5 ft 11 1/2 in)
- Position: Midfielder

Team information
- Current team: Illzach Modenheim

Youth career
- 1992–1998: Mulhouse
- 1999–2000: Le Havre

Senior career*
Years	Team	Apps	(Gls)
1998–1999	Mulhouse	17	(0)
2000–2001	Clermont Foot	30	(3)
2001–2005	Muhlouse	84	(4)
2005–2011	Colmar	64	(6)
2011–	Illzach Modenheim		
- * Club domestic league appearances and goals as of 18 November 2011

Régis Kittler (born 6 October 1979) is a French football player who currently plays for French club AS Illzach Modenheim in the Championnat de France amateur 2. He serves as captain of the club and plays as a defensive midfielder. Kittler joined his current club in 2005 while the club was playing in the Championnat de France amateur 2. He began his career with hometown club FC Mulhouse and played one season with the club before having short stints with professional clubs Le Havre and Clermont Foot. Kittler returned to Mulhouse in 2001 and spent four seasons with the club before signing with Colmar.
