= Tristan M'Bongo =

Congolese footballer (born 1982)

Tristan M'Bongo Luvuezo (born 27 December 1982) is a Congolese former footballer who last played as a midfielder or winger for Balma SC.

== Early life ==
M'Bongo worked as a postman before becoming a professional footballer.

== Club career ==
In 2007, M'Bongo signed for French side Luzenac AP, where he was regarded as a fan favorite. He was regarded as one of the club's most important players. He was their top scorer in the 2009–10 Championnat National. In 2010, he signed for French side RC Strasbourg. He suffered relegation due to financial problems.

== International career ==
M'Bongo made two appearances for the Democratic Republic of the Congo national football team.

== Style of play ==
M'Bongo mainly operated as a left-winger.

== Post-playing career ==
After retiring from professional football, M'Bongo worked as a driver.

== Personal life ==
M'Bongo has a daughter.
