= Stade du Bram =

Stadium in France

Coordinates: 46.625°N 5.21639°E

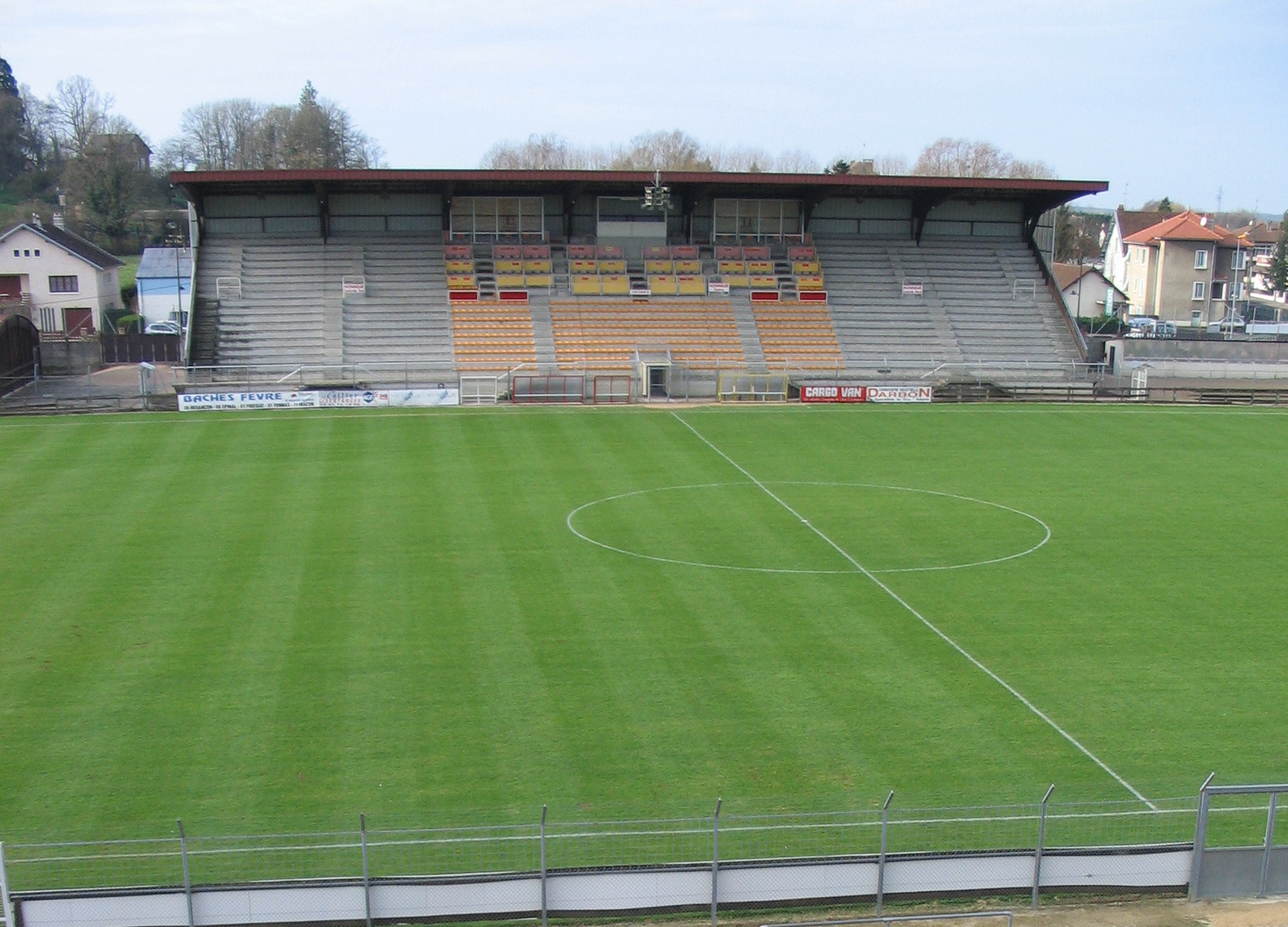
- Interactive map of Stade du Bram
- Full name: Parc des sports du Bram
- Location: Louhans, France
- Capacity: 8,400
- Surface: Grass

Tenant
- CS Louhans-Cuiseaux

Stade du Bram is a stadium in Louhans, France. It is currently used for football matches and is the home stadium of CS Louhans-Cuiseaux. The stadium holds 8,400 spectators.
