= SO Cassis Carnoux =

French football club

- Full name: Stade Olympique Cassis Carnoux
- Nickname(s): SOCC
- Founded: 2002
- Dissolved: 2010
- Ground: (France) Stade Marcel Cerdan
- Capacity: 1500
- Chairman: Jean Claude Fisher
- Manager: Jean-Louis Berenguier
- League: CDA
- 2009–10: CN, 19th
- Website: http://www.cassiscarnouxfoot.fr/
Home colours	Away colours

Stade Olympique Cassis Carnoux was a French association football team founded in 2002. They were based in Cassis, Bouches-du-Rhône, and last played in the Championnat National – the third tier of French football. They had played at the Stade Marcel Cerdan in Carnoux.

The club was dissolved in December 2010.

== Honours ==
- Championnat de France Amateurs Group C Winners: 2008
