= Stade Jules Deschaseaux =

Football stadium in Le Havre, France

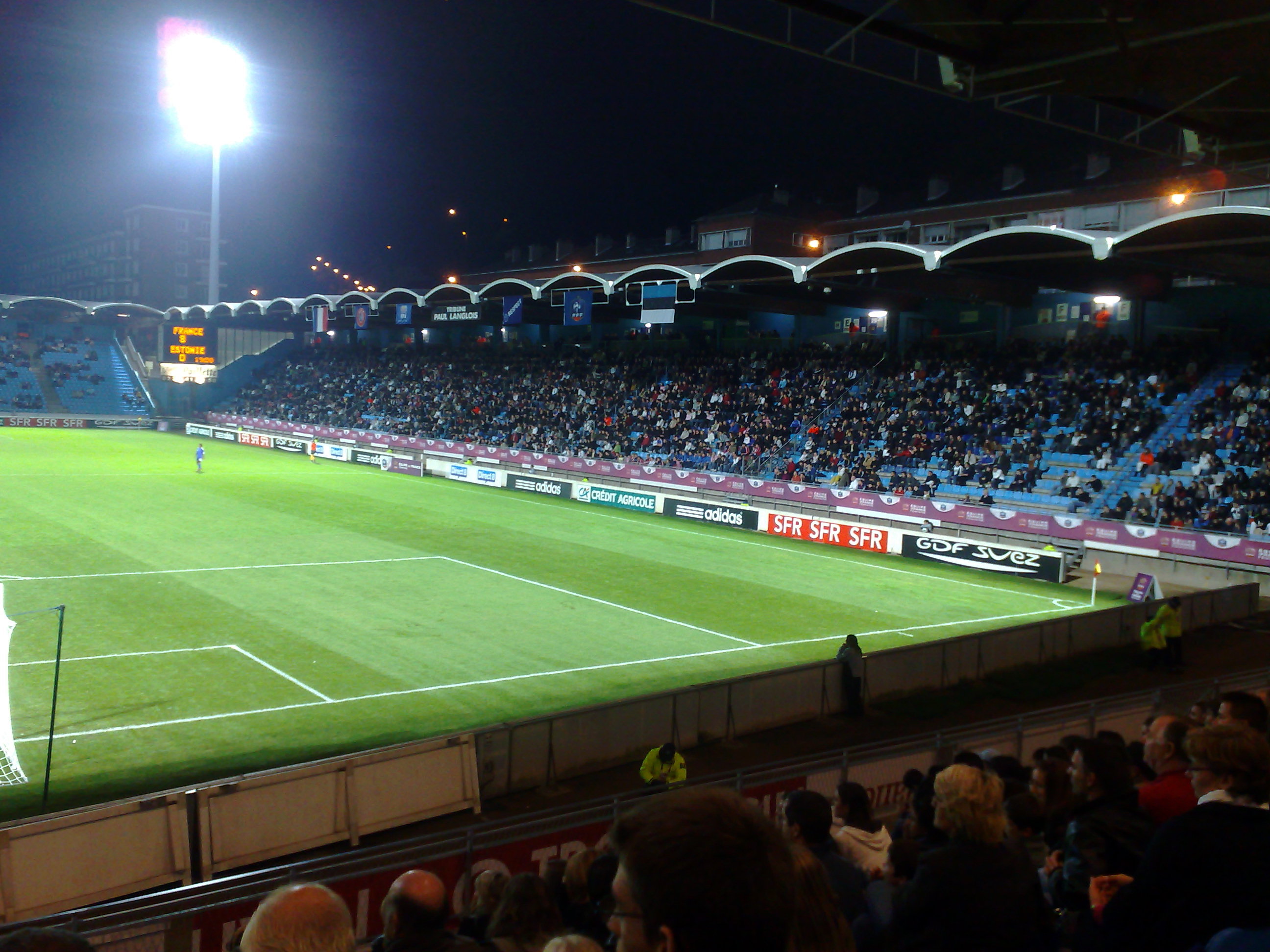
- Interactive map of Stade Jules Deschaseaux
- Former names: Stade municipal du Havre (1932–1954)
- Location: Le Havre, France
- Coordinates: 49°30′07″N 00°10′16″E
- Capacity: 16,382
- Surface: Grass

Construction
- Opened: 1932
- Renovated: 1999

Tenant
- Le Havre AC (1932–2012)

Stade Jules Deschaseaux (French pronunciation: [stad ʒyl deʃazo]) is a multi-purpose stadium in Le Havre, France. It has been used mostly for football matches for most of its existence as the former home of Le Havre AC. The stadium is able to hold 16,400 people and was built in 1932.

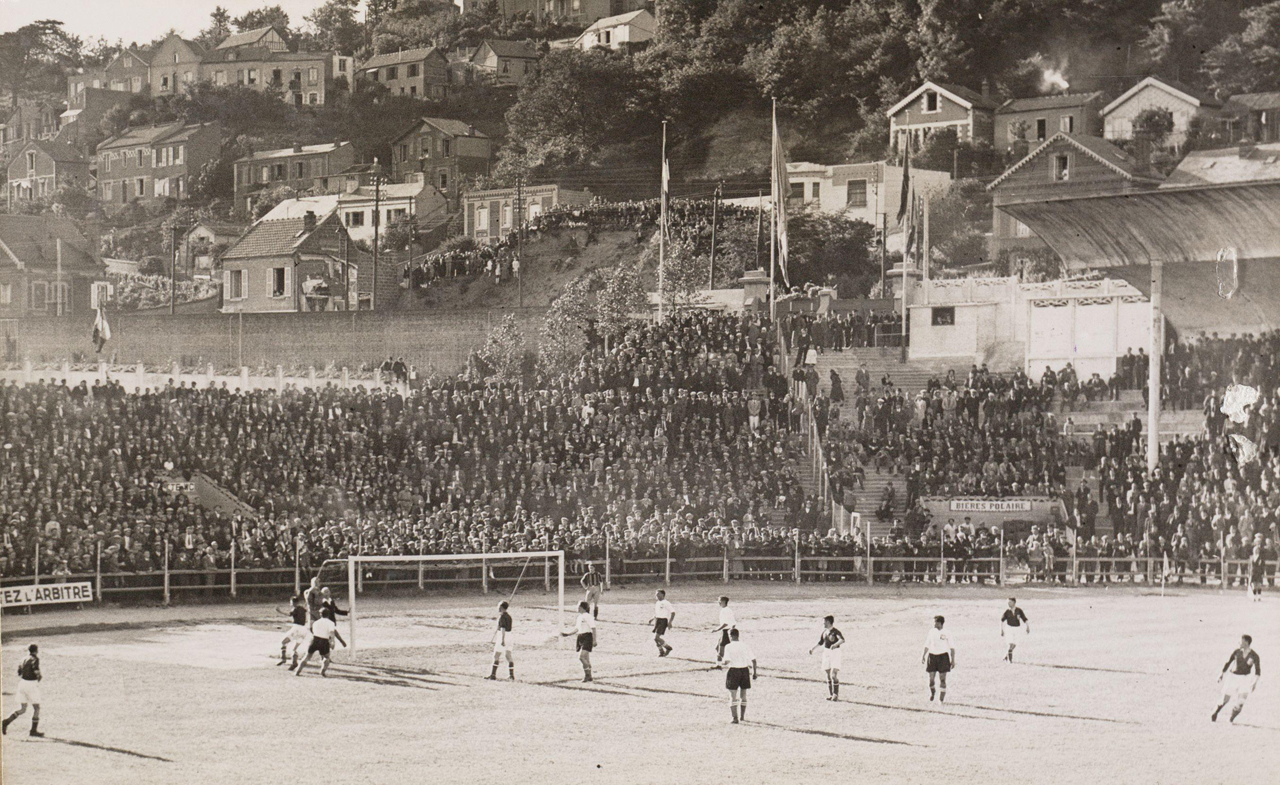
Stade municipal du Havre (now Stade Jules-Deschaseaux) during 1938 FIFA World Cup

It hosted one match at the 1938 FIFA World Cup between Czechoslovakia and the Netherlands.

In 2012, it was replaced by the newly constructed Stade Océane. The ground is now used by the rugby section of Havre Athlétique Club.

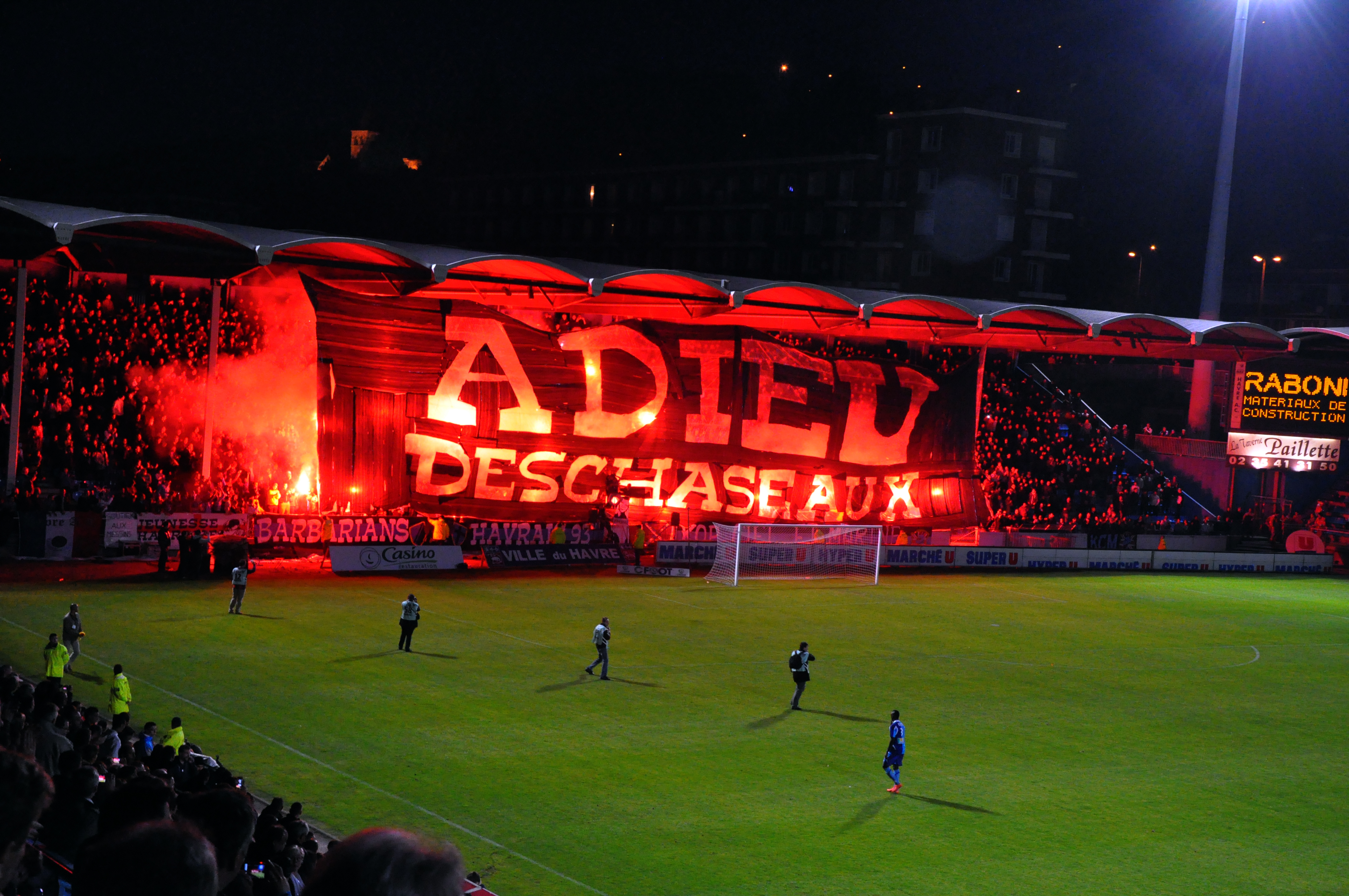
Fans unfurled a banner at Le Havre's last match at Stade Jules Deschaseaux on 18 May 2012.
