= Belcodène =

Commune in Provence-Alpes-Côte d'Azur, France

- Commune
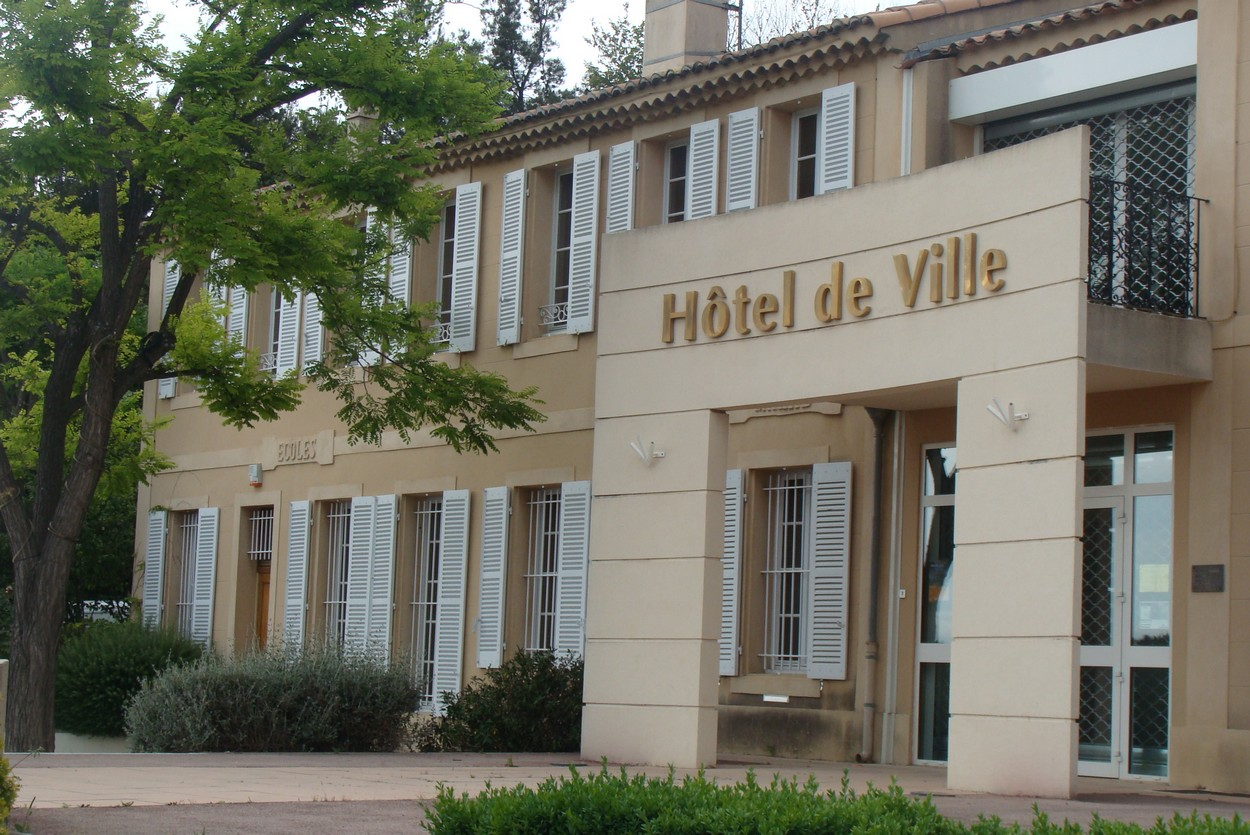
- Town hall

- Coat of arms
- Location of Belcodène
- Location within France Location within Provence-Alpes-Côte d'Azur
- Coordinates: 43°25′38″N 5°35′22″E
- Country: France
- Region: Provence-Alpes-Côte d'Azur
- Department: Bouches-du-Rhône
- Arrondissement: Marseille
- Canton: Allauch
- Intercommunality: Aix-Marseille-Provence

Government
  - Mayor (2026–32): Gilles Collomb
- Area^{1}: 12.97 km^{2} (5.01 sq mi)
- Elevation: 425 m (1,394 ft)
- Highest elevation: 450 m (1,480 ft)
- Lowest elevation: 297 m (974 ft)
- Population (2023): 2,009
  - Density: 154.9/km^{2} (401.2/sq mi)
- Time zone: UTC+01:00 (CET)
  - Summer (DST): UTC+02:00 (CEST)
- INSEE/Postal code: 13013 /13720
- Dialling codes: 0442
- ^{1} French Land Register data, which excludes lakes, ponds, glaciers > 1 km^{2} (0.386 sq mi or 247 acres) and river estuaries.

Belcodène (French pronunciation: [bɛlkɔdɛn]; Occitan: Brecòda) is a commune situated east of Marseille in the department of Bouches-du-Rhône in the Provence-Alpes-Côte d'Azur region in southern France. There is a beautiful cohabitation between the horses and the humans. A peaceful and quiet agreement between the two parts can be observed.

== Population ==
Historical population
Year	Pop.	±% p.a.
1968	195	—
1975	327	+7.66%
1982	542	+7.49%
1990	865	+6.02%
1999	1,434	+5.78%
2007	1,731	+2.38%
2012	1,849	+1.33%
2017	1,898	+0.52%
2023	2,009	+0.95%
Source: INSEE

Its inhabitants are called Belcodénois in French.

== See also ==
- Communes of the Bouches-du-Rhône department
