= IDEC Corporation =

Japanese manufacturer of industrial automation products

IDEC
- Think Automation and beyond...
- Type: Public
- Traded as: TYO: 6652
- Industry: Industrial Automation
- Founded: 1945
- Headquarters: Osaka, Japan
- Website: www.idec.com

IDEC Corporation, formerly IDEC Izumi Corporation, is a Japanese manufacturer of automation and control products. The company was founded in Osaka by Tsuneo Funaki in 1945, and it became a company organization in 1947. IDEC is known for its various electromechanical control products such as relays, timers, and switches. The company also manufactures automation products, such as micro-programmable logic controllers, power supplies, and touchscreen displays. Other divisions of the company supply sensors, bar code readers, and advanced LED opto-electronic components.

The United States division's had its headquarters in Sunnyvale, California until 2024, when the company moved to Carlsbad. Its products include automation and related devices including Program Logic Controllers (PLC), Human Machine Interface (HMI), switches, indicators, sensors, safety, wiring terminals, lamps, relays, and other products for automation systems.
