= Léonard Mendy =

French footballer (born 1982)

Personal information
- Date of birth: 22 March 1982 (age 44)
- Place of birth: Évreux, France
- Height: 1.83 m (6 ft 0 in)
- Position: Centre-back

Senior career*
Years	Team	Apps	(Gls)
2001–2003	Le Havre	1	(0)
2003–2004	Troyes B		
2004–2005	FC Dieppe		
2005–2006	Crawley Town		
2007	Clermont	2	(0)
2008	Istres		
2008–2010	Gueugnon		
2010–2012	Beauvais		
2012–2016	Rouen		
- * Club domestic league appearances and goals

Léonard Mendy (born 22 March 1982) is a French former professional footballer who plays as a centre-back. He played on the professional level in Ligue 2 for Le Havre and Clermont.
