= Stade Pacy-Ménilles =

Football stadium in Ménilles, France

Coordinates: 49°1′40″N 1°22′20″E

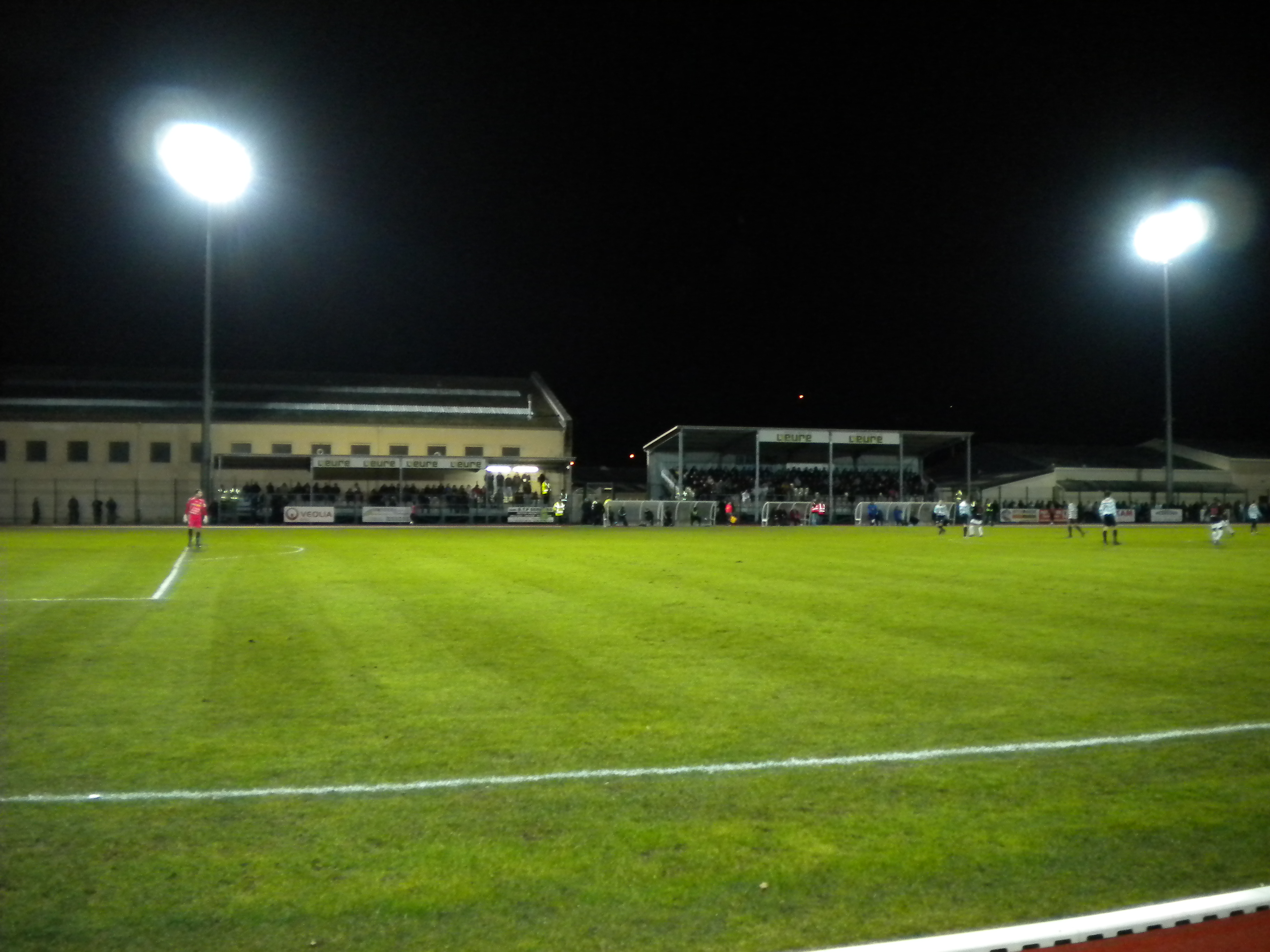
Stade des Ménilles 3

Stade Pacy-Ménilles is a multi-use stadium in Ménilles, near Pacy-sur-Eure, France. It is currently used mostly for football matches and is the home stadium of Pacy Vallée-d'Eure. The stadium is able to hold 2,000 people.
