= UJA Maccabi Paris Métropole =

French football club

UJA Maccabi Paris
- Full name: UJA Maccabi Paris Métropole
- Founded: 1926 as "UJA Alfortville"; 1948 as "Maccabi Paris"; 2012 as UJA Maccabi Paris Métropole
- Ground: Parc Départemental des Sports; Choisy-le-Roi
- Chairman: Pascal Laloux
- Manager: David Le Digarcher
- League: DH Paris Île-de-France
- 2016–17: CFA 2, Group A, 14th (relegated)
- Website: https://maccabi-paris.footeo.com/
Home colours	Away colours

UJA Maccabi Paris Métropole is a French association football club based in Alfortville, a suburb of Paris. The current club was formed in 2012 through a merger of UJA Alfortville (formed in 1926) and SC Maccabi du Paris (formed in 1948).

The club currently play in the Division d'Honneur Paris Île-de-France, effectively the sixth level of French football. It plays its home matches at the Parc Départemental des Sports in the nearby commune of Choisy-le-Roi.

The club has played one season in the Championnat National, having been awarded promotion in the 2009–10 season.

== History ==
=== SC Maccabi de Paris ===
Maccabi Paris
- Full name: Sporting Club Maccabi Paris
- Founded: 1948
- Dissolved: 2012 (became UJA Maccabi Paris Métropole)
- Ground: 30 Rue Louis Lumière; Paris, France 75020
- Chairman: (France) Maurice Benayoun
- Manager: (France) (Tunisia) Charly Aïdan
Home colours	Away colours

Maccabi Paris was a club established in 1948 as a social-sport club for the Jewish community in Paris, it acted in modern times as a simple sport club for a wider French community.

=== UJA Alfortville ===
UJA Alfortville was formed in 1926 under the name Union de la Jeunesse Arménienne d'Alfortville (known simply as Alfortville).

Over the course of a decade, Alfortville has quickly ascended up the French football league system. In 1998, the club was promoted from Promotion d'Honneur. In the following season, Alfortville earned promotion to the Division d'Honneur Régionale and proceeded to advance to the Division Supérieure Régionale two seasons later in 2000. The club remained in the seventh division for six years before achieving promotion to the Division d'Honneur of the Île-de-France region. After one season, Alfortville ascended to the 5th level of the system, CFA 2. The club won its group in the first season, thus earning promotion to the Championnat de France amateur for the 2008–09 season.

After two seasons in the CFA, Alfortville were administratively promoted to the Championnat National due to the demotion through financial issues of RC Strasbourg Alsace. The club was relegated at the end of the season.

=== UJA Maccabi Paris Métropole ===
In June 2012, UJA Alfortville completed the merger with Maccabi Paris, a club from the Division Supérieure Régional. The new club was relegated to the CFA 2 in its first season, and has maintained that level since.

== Players ==
=== Former players ===
For a list of former UJA Alfortville players, see Category:UJA Maccabi Paris Métropole players.

== Notable players ==
- (France) Leny Yoro (youth)

== Honours ==
- Championnat de France Amateur 2: 2008
- Division d'Honneur (Île-de-France): 2007
- Division Supérieure Régional (Île-de-France): 2006
