= Ali Mathlouthi =

French footballer (born 1987)

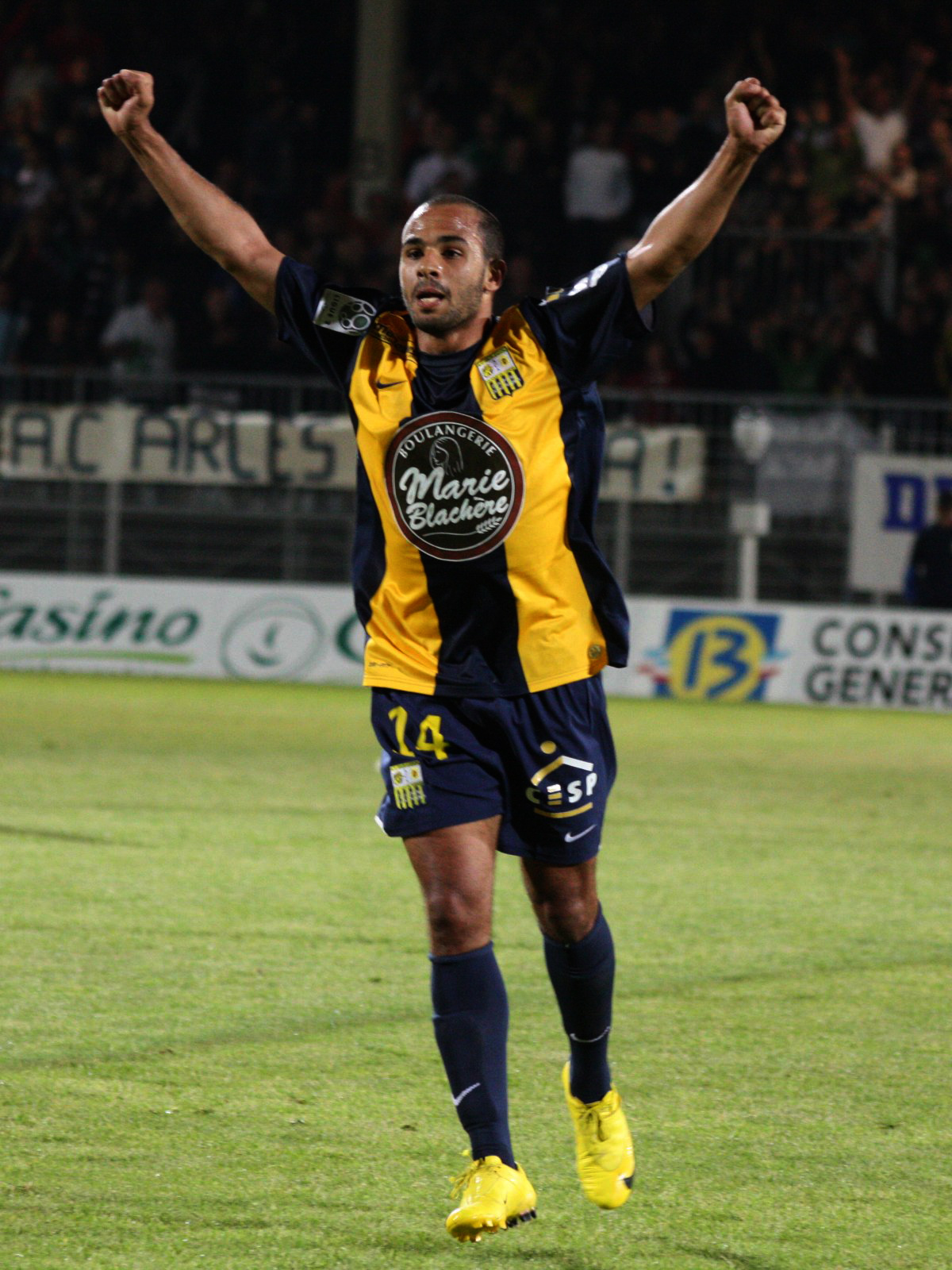
- Mathlouthi in 2010

Personal information
- Full name: Ali-Azouz Mathlouthi
- Date of birth: 22 April 1987 (age 39)
- Place of birth: Saint-Denis, France
- Height: 1.76 m (5 ft 9 in)
- Position: Striker

Youth career
- Racing Besançon

Senior career*
| Years | Team | Apps | (Gls) |
| 2004–2005 | Racing Besançon | 6 | (1) |
| 2005–2009 | Strasbourg B | 46 | (9) |
| 2006–2011 | Strasbourg | 43 | (7) |
| 2007–2008 | → Châteauroux (loan) | 25 | (4) |
| 2009 | → Racing de Ferrol (loan) | 10 | (1) |
| 2009–2010 | → Arles-Avignon (loan) | 22 | (1) |
| 2011–2012 | Lens | 12 | (0) |
| 2012–2013 | Club Africain | 3 | (0) |
| 2014–2015 | Mulhouse | 32 | (8) |
| 2015–2016 | Fréjus Saint-Raphaël | 3 | (0) |
| 2016–2018 | Schiltigheim | 23 | (8) |
| Total | | 225 | (39) |
- * Club domestic league appearances and goals

Ali-Azouz Mathlouthi (Arabic: علي مثلوثي; born 22 April 1987) is a French professional footballer who played as a striker.

== Career ==
Mathlouthi began his career at Strasbourg. He was promoted to the first team in 2006. He joined Châteauroux on loan in July 2007. After twelve months, he returned to Strasbourg. He left Strasbourg, again on loan, on 19 January 2009 to join Racing de Ferrol, of the Spanish third division. The player returned at the end of the season.

== Personal life ==
Born in France, Mathlouthi holds both French and Tunisian nationalities.
