= Grégory Dutil =

French footballer (born 1980)

Personal information
- Date of birth: 30 December 1980 (age 45)
- Place of birth: Nice, France
- Height: 1.80 m (5 ft 11 in)
- Position: Striker

Team information
- Current team: FC Miami City

Senior career*
Years	Team	Apps	(Gls)
1999–2000	Lunel		
2000–2001	Arles	33	(7)
2001–2002	Saint-Étienne B	21	(10)
2002–2003	Racing Club de Ferrol	17	(1)
2003–2007	Martigues	90	(32)
2007–2008	Toulon	20	(9)
2008–2011	Fréjus Saint-Raphaël	77	(28)
2011–2012	Nîmes Olympique	5	(0)
2013–2014	Calvi		
2016	FC Miami City		
- * Club domestic league appearances and goals as of 09:12, 2 September 2012 (UTC)

Grégory Dutil (born 30 December 1980) is a French professional footballer who currently plays as a forward for FC Miami City.

Dutil played on the professional level in the Spanish Segunda División for Racing Club de Ferrol.
