= Pacy Ménilles RC =

French football club

- Full name: Pacy Ménilles Racing Club
- Founded: 1932
- Ground: Stade Pacy-Ménilles
- Capacity: 2,000
- League: Régional 1
- 2019–20: National 3, 13th
Home colours	Away colours

Pacy Ménilles Racing Club is a French football club based in Pacy-sur-Eure, Eure. It was founded in 1932. The club plays at the Stade Pacy-Ménilles, which has a capacity of 2,000. The colours of the club are blue and black.

Initially known as Pacy Vallée-d'Eure Football, the club faced financial difficulties following the departure of club president Gilles Caoudal during the 2010–11 season and on 2 July 2012, the club filed for bankruptcy with debts of €300,000. The club was relaunched as Pacy Ménilles Racing Club, taking the place of Pacy VEF's reserve side in Division d'Honneur, and reached the national amateur level again in 2017 after promotion to National 3.

== Honours ==
- Normandie DH Championship
  - Champions (1): 1994
- Championnat de France Amateurs Group A
  - Champions (1): 2008

== Notable players ==
- (France) Gaël Angoula
- (France) Yassin El-Azzouzi
- (Morocco) Jawad El Hajri
- (Guinea) Daouda Jabi
- (France) Sébastien Larcier
- (France) Christophe Meslin
- (Algeria) Chérif Oudjani
- (France) Brice Samba (youth)
- (France) Romain Thomas
- (Cameroon) Hervé Tum
