= Gap HAFC =

Defunct football club based in Gap, France

- Full name: Gap Hautes-Alpes Football Club
- Founded: 1970
- Dissolved: 2012
- Ground: Stade Municipal de Gap, Gap
- Capacity: 5,000
- Chairman: Michel Martin
- 2011–12: CFA Group C, 18th
- Website: www.gapfoot05.com
Home colours	Away colours

Gap Hautes-Alpes Football Club (Occitan Gap Auts-Aups; commonly referred to as simply Gap) was a French semi-professional association football club based in Gap, the capital city of the Hautes-Alpes department. The club was formed in 1970 as a result of a merger between Sporting Club Olympique Gapençais (founded in 1962) and CSL Louis Jean (founded in 1969). In the club's last season of play in 2011–12, the senior team finished bottom of the Championnat de France amateur Group C, the fourth level of French football. The club achieved promotion to the Championnat National following the 2009–10 season. On 29 May 2000, Gap changed its name to its current version. Gap played its home matches at the Stade Municipal de Gap located within the commune. The team was last managed by Patrick Bruzzichessi.

In June 2012, the club was dissolved, having gone into receivership in December 2011 with debts of around €700,000. The following month a new club named Gap Foot 05, playing at the tenth tier of the French football pyramid, was formed.

== Honours ==
- Championnat de France amateur
  - Champions (1): 2010
- Championnat de France amateur 2
  - Champions (1): 2003
- Division d'Honneur (Provence-Alpes-Côte d'Azur)
  - Champions (1): 2001
