= Louhans-Cuiseaux FC =

French football club, based in Louhans

- Full name: Association Sportive Louhans-Cuiseaux FC
- Founded: 1970; 56 years ago
- Ground: Stade du Bram, Louhans
- Capacity: 8,400
- Chairman: Dominique Prudent
- Manager: Frédéric Jay
- League: Régional 1 Bourgogne-Franche-Comté
- 2025–26: Régional 1 Bourgogne-Franche-Comté Group B, 6th of 12
- Website: www.louhans-cuiseaux-fc.fr
Home colours	Away colours

Louhans-Cuiseaux Football Club is a football club located in Louhans, France.

== History ==
The club was founded in 1970 as Club Sportif Louhans Cuiseaux 71 after the merger of Club Sportif Louhannais (founded in 1916) and Club de Cuiseaux (founded in 1930), based in the villages of Louhans and Cuiseaux. It took the current name after a further merger with FC Louhans in 2013. The club currently competes in the Championnat National 3, the fifthlevel of the French football league system, following relegation in 2023, and plays at the Stade du Bram.

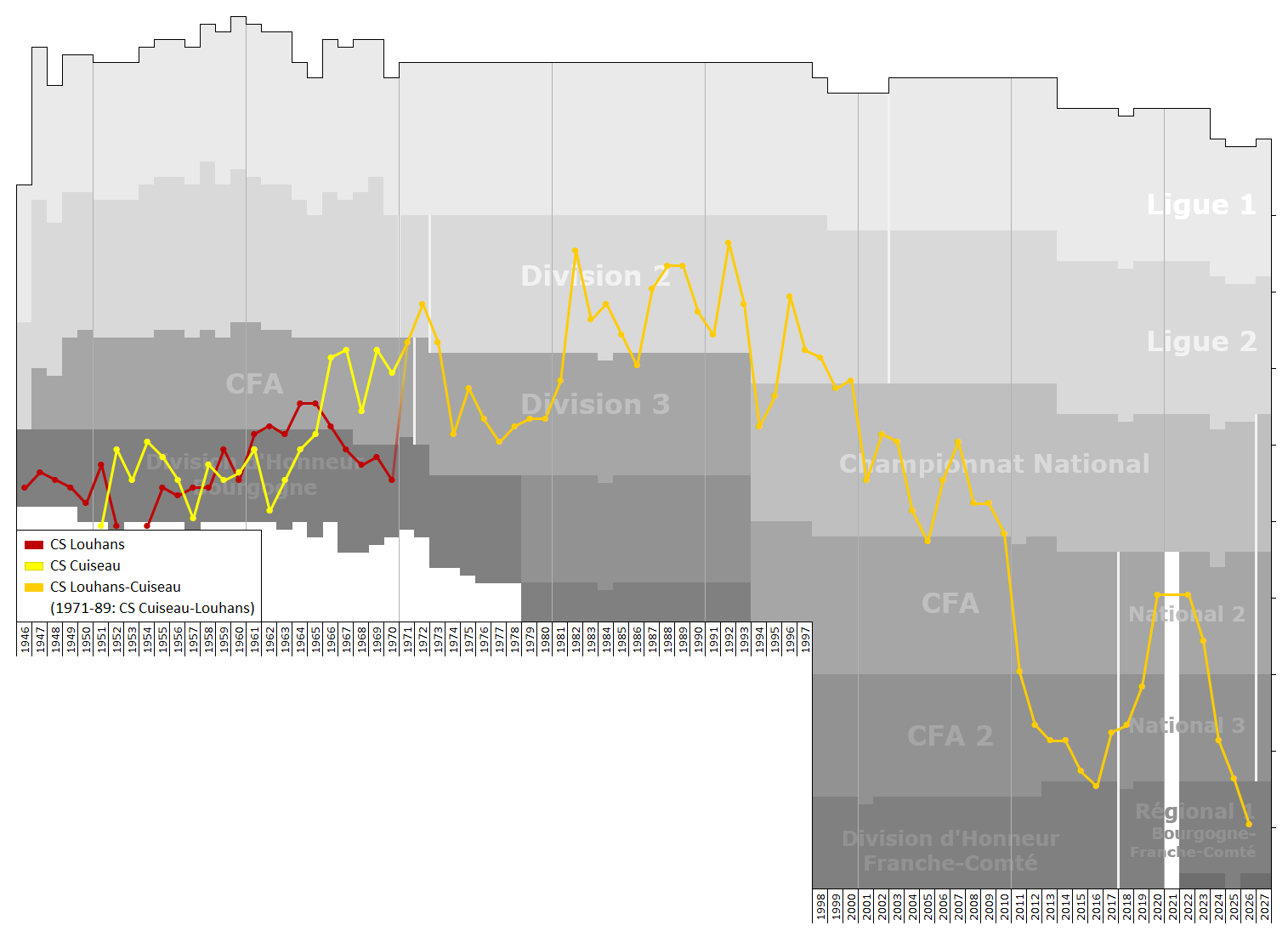
Historical league performance chart of Louhans-Cuiseau FC

On 13 June 2006, Togo midfielder Alaixys Romao made history when he became the first Louhans-Cuiseaux player ever to appear at the World Cup finals, in Togo's first-round game against South Korea in Frankfurt.

== Former managers ==
- Philippe Hinschberger
- Christian Lariepe
- Alain Michel
