= 2010 Coupe Gambardella final =

- Event: 2009–10 Coupe Gambardella
Sochaux	Metz
1	1
- Metz win 4–3 on penalties.
- Date: 1 May 2010
- Venue: Stade de France, Saint-Denis
- Referee: Aurélien Petit (Ligue Rhône-Alpes)
- Weather: 16 °C (61 °F), Cloudy

The 2010 Coupe Gambardella final was the 55th final of France's youth cup competition. The final took place on 1 May 2010 at the Stade de France in the Parisian suburb of Saint-Denis and served as a curtain raiser for the final of the Coupe de France. The match was contested between Sochaux and Metz. The final was shown live on France 4.

== Team background ==
Sochaux entered the final for the 3rd time in the club's history. Sochaux first appeared in the final in 1973 finishing as runners-up to Nantes. In their next two appearances, the team were crowned champions defeating Lens 1–0 in 1983 and Auxerre 5–4 on penalties in 2007 after the match ended 2–2 after 90 minutes. The 2007 team was led by Marvin Martin, Ryad Boudebouz, Sloan Privat, and Geoffrey Tulasne. All four players are now regulars in the senior Sochaux team.

Metz's appearance in the Gambardella final marked their 4th appearance in the competition's ultimate match. Of the appearances, Metz have won the cup twice, first in 1981 defeating Nice 1–0, and again in 2001 handling Caen 2–0. The 2001 team was anchored by goalkeeper Ludovic Butelle and midfielders Laurent Agouazi and Ludovic Obraniak. All three players had respectable careers at Metz before moving on to other Ligue 1 clubs.

== Match ==
=== Details ===
1 May 2010
17:15 CET

Sochaux	1–1	Metz
Bakambu 39'	Report	Faucher 53'
Penalties
Giraud (penalty missed); Gürler (penalty missed); Bakambu (penalty scored); Dias (penalty scored); Pereira (penalty scored)	3 – 4	(penalty missed) Kayombo; (penalty scored) N'Ganvala; (penalty scored) Ngbakoto; (penalty scored) Ferino; (penalty scored) Nya Ngatcha

Stade de France, Saint-Denis
Referee: Aurélien Petit (Ligue Rhône-Alpes)

Sochaux	Metz

SOCHAUX:
GK	1	(France) Pierrick Cros
RB	2	(France) Clément Giraud
CB	3	(France) Jérôme Roussillon
CB	4	(France) Bastien Faugere
LB	5	(France) Yann Boa Kane
CM	6	(Cameroon) Petrus Boumal		(substituted off) 65'
CM	8	(France) Cheick Kourouma
RM	7	(Turkey) Serdar Gürler (c)
LM	11	(France) Cédric Bakambu
AM	10	(Portugal) Rafaël Dias
FW	9	(France) Plaisir Bahamboula	(yellow card) 60'	(substituted off) 76'
Substitutes:
GK	16	(France) Yoann Collas
DF	12	(France) Pierre Brice Ah-Yo
MF	13	(France) Yven Moyo		(substituted on) 76'
MF	14	(France) Quentin Pereira		(substituted on) 65'
FW	15	(Cameroon) Célestin N'Dongo
Manager:
(France) Jean-Sébastien Mérieux

METZ:
GK	1	(France) Anthony Mfa Mezui
RB	2	(France) Adrien Ferino
CB	5	(France) Kalidou Koulibaly	(yellow card) 41'
CB	4	(France) Teddy Kayombo
LB	3	(France) Gaëtan Bussman
DM	6	(Belgium) Djamel N'Ganvala (c)
CM	7	(France) Samy Kehli		(substituted off) 71'
CM	8	(France) Bouna Sarr		(substituted off) 78'
RW	9	(France) Jordan Faucher		(substituted off) 84'
LW	10	(France) Yeni Ngbakoto
FW	11	(Mali) Seydou Simpara
Substitutes:
GK	16	(France) Siegfried Aisse Kede
DF	12	(France) Yohan Croizet		(substituted on) 71'
MF	13	(France) Jeremy Meligner		(substituted on) 78'
MF	14	(Ivory Coast) Romaric Nya Ngatcha		(substituted on) 84'
FW	15	(France) Clément Sannier
Manager:
(France) Olivier Perrin

MATCH OFFICIALS

- Assistant referees:
  - Romain Galibert (Ligue Atlantique)
  - Sylvain Barcella (Ligue d'Aquitaine)
- Fourth official: Jonathan Signoret (Ligue d'Auvergne)

MATCH RULES

- 90 minutes.
- Penalty shoot-out if scores still level after 90 minutes.
- Five named substitutes.
- Maximum of three substitutions.

== Road to the Final ==
Sochaux

Second Round	Sochaux	11–0	Orléans
Round of 64	Dijon	2–5	Sochaux
Round of 32	Rhône Vallées	1–5	Sochaux
Round of 16	Gueugnon	0–0(aet); 4–5 pen.	Sochaux
Quarter-finals	Sochaux	2–1	Toulouse
Semi-final	Sochaux	4–1	Nantes

Metz

Second Round	Amilly	0–2	Metz
Round of 64	Thionville	0–5	Metz
Round of 32	Chantilly	1–3	Metz
Round of 16	Saint-Étienne	1–1(aet); 3–4 pen.	Metz
Quarter-finals	Metz	3–3(aet); 3–2 pen.	Lyon
Semi-final	Sedan	1–3	Metz
