= 2010–11 Championnat de France Amateur =

Championnat de France amateur
- Season: 2010–11
- Champions: Gazélec Ajaccio (club); Lyon B (reserves)
- Promoted: Besançon; Le Poiré-sur-Vie; Quevilly
- Relegated: Aurillac; Béziers; Caen B Louhans-Cuiseaux; Genêts Anglet; Lille B Lyon-Duchère; Mantes; Monts d'Or Azergues; Noisy-le-Sec; Rennes B Saint-Pryvé Saint-Hilaire
- Matches: 1,188
- Goals: 2,776 (2.34 per match)
- Top goalscorer: Samir Benmeziane (19 goals)
- Biggest home win: Colomiers 6–0 Genêts Anglet (21 August 2010); Les Herbiers 6–0 Caen B (26 March 2011)
- Biggest away win: Caen B 0–5 Yzeure (7 November 2010); Louhans-Cuiseaux 0–5 Paris SG B (29 January 2011); Jura Sud 0–5 Paris SG B (14 May 2011)
- Highest scoring: Pau 7–2 Le Pontet (28 May 2011)
- Longest winning run: 5 games Martigues (14 August – 11 September); Red Star Paris (14 August – 11 September)
- Longest unbeaten run: 21 games Épinal (7 August – 19 March)
- Longest losing run: 16 games Louhans-Cuiseaux (7 August – 12 February)

The 2010–11 Championnat de France amateur was the 13th edition since its establishment. Colmar were the defending champions. Due to the elongated appeals process involving each clubs' eligibility, the groups and fixtures were unveiled to the public on 15 July 2010 and the season began on 7 August and ended on 28 May 2011. The winter break was in effect between 18 December and 15 January 2011. There were 12 promoted teams from the Championnat de France amateur 2, replacing the 13 teams that were relegated from the Championnat de France amateur following the 2009–10 season. A total of 69 teams currently competes in the league with 12 clubs suffering relegation to the fifth division, the Championnat de France amateur 2. All non-reserve clubs that secured league status for the season were subject to approval by the DNCG before becoming eligible to participate in the competition.

On 7 May 2011, despite having the week off, Le Poiré-sur-Vie became the first club from the Championnat de France amateur to achieve promotion from the fourth division to the Championnat National. The club's spot in the third division was confirmed following second-place Les Herbiers' 0–0 draw with the reserve team of professional club Lorient. Two weeks later, both Besançon and Gazélec Ajaccio were promoted to the Championnat National after recording victories during the match day. Gazélec Ajaccio result also rewarded the club the honour of being the champion of the Championnat de France amateur. On the final day of the season, Quevilly became the final club in the CFA to earn promotion to National after drawing with Poissy.

== Changes in 2010–11 ==
=== Promotion and relegation ===
Teams relegated to Championnat de France amateur

- Moulins
- Hyères
- Louhans-Cuiseaux

Teams promoted to Championnat de France amateur

- Aubervilliers
- Avion
- Belfort
- Béziers
- Lorient Reserves
- Metz Reserves
- AS Monaco Reserves
- Monts d'Or Azergues
- Le Poiré-sur-Vie
- Poissy
- Saint-Étienne Reserves
- Saint-Pryvé Saint-Hilaire
- Tarbes Pyrénées Football
- Uzès Pont du Gard

=== DNCG rulings ===
On 15 June 2010, following a review of each club's administrative and financial accounts in the Championnat de France amateur, the DNCG ruled that Besançon RC, Hyères FC, CS Louhans-Cuiseaux, FC Montceau Bourgogne, EDS Montluçon, Olympique Noisy-le-Sec, and RCF Paris would be relegated to the Championnat de France amateur 2. The organization also ruled that newly promoted club Calais RUFC would be excluded from ascending up to the fourth division, while SO Cassis Carnoux, which had been relegated to the CFA from the Championnat National, would also be excluded from the league. The second place club in Calais' group, CMS Oissel, who was set to replace Calais was also denied promotion to the Championnat de France amateur. All clubs had the option to appeal the decision.

On 2 July, local media in Alsace reported that Strasbourg were on the verge of being relegated to the Championnat de France amateur by the DNCG due to financial issues. The club responded by announcing its willingness to appeal if the news reported was confirmed. With the club's accounts still being reviewed, Strasbourg's financial issues were slightly alleviated after the sale of striker Magaye Gueye to English club Everton for €1.4 million. Strasbourg later transferred captain Guillaume Lacour and Algerian international Yacine Bezzaz to Évian and Troyes, respectively, for nominal fees. On 16 July, the report was confirmed when the DNCG officially relegated Strasbourg to the CFA. Strasbourg appealed the decision the following week. On 22 July, Strasbourg's appeal was successful with the DNCG ruling in favor of a return to National.

On 7 July, Besançon, Hyères, and Oissel's appeals were heard by the DNCG Appeals Committee. Following deliberation and explanations from each club, the committee ruled in favor of Besançon, but upheld the appeals of Hyères and Oissel. The following day, the appeals committee granted both Louhans-Cuiseaux and Noisy-le-Sec appeals to stay in the fourth division. However, the committee, upheld the rulings of Calais, Montceau Bourgogne, Montluçon, and Racing Paris.

== League tables ==
=== Group A ===
Pos	Team	Pld	W	D	L	GF	GA	GD	Pts	Promotion or relegation
1	Quevilly (P)	32	18	9	5	58	33	+25	95	Promotion to Championnat National
2	Red Star	32	16	12	4	37	21	+16	92	
3	CA Bastia	32	17	9	6	44	27	+17	91 (Note: CA Bastia were docked one point.)	
4	Metz Reserves	32	14	11	7	42	32	+10	85	Championnat de France amateur Playoffs
5	Poissy	32	13	6	13	45	46	−1	77	
6	Villemomble	32	9	14	9	29	35	−6	73	
7	Avion	32	10	11	11	40	43	−3	73	
8	Compiègne	32	10	10	12	28	38	−10	71 (Note: Compiègne were docked one point.)	
9	Drancy	32	10	10	12	25	23	+2	72	
10	Sénart-Moissy	32	9	12	11	22	28	−6	71	
11	Havre Reserves	32	10	9	13	38	35	+3	71	
12	Lens Reserves	32	10	8	14	41	44	−3	70	
13	Aubervilliers	32	9	11	12	40	45	−5	70	
14	L'Entente SSG	32	9	11	12	33	36	−3	70	
15	Mantes (R)	32	10	6	16	35	43	−8	68	Relegation to Championnat de France amateur 2
16	Lille Reserves (R)	32	7	11	14	40	48	−8	64	Relegation to Championnat de France amateur 2
17	Noisy-le-Sec (R)	32	5	12	15	30	52	−22	59	Relegation to Championnat de France amateur 2

Updated to match(es) played on 28 May 2011. Source: French Football Federation
Rules for classification: 1) points; 2) goal difference; 3) number of goals scored.
(P) Promoted; (R) Relegated

==== Results ====
Home \ Away	AUB	AVI	CAB	COM	DRN	HACR	LEN	SSG	LIL	MNT	MTZ	NLS	POI	QUE	RSFC	SEN	VMB
Aubervilliers		1–1	1–1	2–0	1–0	1–2	0–3	0–0	4–1	2–1	2–3	1–0	4–1	1–3	2–2	0–3	2–0
Avion	2–1		0–1	0–1	2–0	1–1	0–2	1–1	1–1	3–3	3–0	1–1	2–0	1–1	1–1	2–1	1–1
CA Bastia	3–2	3–0		4–1	1–0	1–0	2–0	1–0	3–1	2–3	1–0	3–0	2–0	2–1	2–2	1–0	2–0
Compiègne	0–0	1–1	1–1		2–1	0–0	1–0	1–1	1–2	1–0	1–1	1–1	0–3	0–2	0–1	2–0	2–2
Drancy	2–0	2–0	0–0	1–0		0–0	4–0	1–1	1–0	0–1	0–2	1–1	2–0	0–3	0–0	4–0	0–0
Havre Reserves	2–0	3–1	1–1	1–2	0–2		3–1	1–2	2–1	4–0	0–0	4–1	1–2	0–1	1–0	0–1	2–0
Lens Reserves	1–1	1–2	2–0	0–0	2–0	3–1		1–2	1–1	2–0	0–2	1–2	0–2	1–2	0–2	0–0	4–4
L'Entente SSG	0–1	4–3	1–0	0–1	1–2	0–1	1–2		1–1	1–0	0–0	0–0	0–0	0–0	1–3	1–2	4–0
Lille Reserves	3–0	1–3	0–2	0–1	0–0	2–2	1–3	1–3		0–0	1–3	1–0	4–0	4–1	0–1	1–1	0–0
Mantes	0–1	2–3	1–2	2–1	0–1	2–1	0–0	1–2	3–1		1–1	4–0	3–1	1–4	1–2	0–0	0–1
Metz Reserves	2–2	2–0	1–1	1–0	0–0	2–1	2–0	2–1	1–0	1–2		3–0	2–2	2–2	2–2	2–0	0–3
Noisy-le-Sec	1–1	2–2	3–0	1–0	1–1	2–2	2–4	1–1	1–4	0–1	0–2		1–2	2–4	1–1	1–0	2–1
Poissy	2–1	0–1	2–2	5–2	1–0	3–0	1–3	3–1	2–3	1–0	0–1	2–1		1–1	3–0	2–2	0–1
Quevilly	2–1	1–0	1–1	1–3	1–0	1–1	3–2	3–1	1–1	2–0	4–1	2–0	2–0		2–2	1–0	5–1
Red Star	1–1	0–1	2–1	1–0	1–0	1–0	1–0	2–0	2–0	0–1	0–0	0–0	2–2	1–0		1–0	0–0
Sénart-Moissy	1–1	2–1	0–0	0–1	1–0	1–0	1–1	0–0	1–1	0–0	2–1	1–0	0–1	1–1	0–2		1–0
Villemomble	2–2	1–0	0–0	2–1	0–0	0–0	1–1	1–2	0–0	3–2	1–0	0–2	2–0	2–0	0–0	0–0	

Updated to match(es) played on 28 May 2011. Source: French Football Federation
Legend: Blue = home team win; Yellow = draw; Red = away team win.

=== Group B ===
Pos	Team	Pld	W	D	L	GF	GA	GD	Pts	Promotion or relegation
1	Besançon (P)	32	18	10	4	41	22	+19	96	Promotion to Championnat National
2	Épinal	32	15	16	1	51	22	+29	93	
3	Ivry	32	15	11	6	53	31	+22	88	
4	Sochaux Reserves	32	16	5	11	49	36	+13	85	Championnat de France amateur Playoffs
5	Villefranche	32	15	5	12	45	34	+11	82	
6	Amnéville	32	13	10	9	50	45	+5	81	
7	Bourg-Péronnas	32	12	11	9	50	48	+2	79	
8	Paris Saint-Germain Reserves	32	13	7	12	55	41	+14	78	
9	Auxerre Reserves	32	10	14	8	41	32	+9	76	
10	Nancy Reserves	32	11	10	11	48	40	+8	75	
11	Mulhouse	32	9	14	9	45	44	+1	73	
12	Jura Sud	32	13	5	14	35	42	−7	76	
13	Belfort	32	9	11	12	34	35	−1	70	
14	Raon-l'Étape	32	9	10	13	39	49	−10	69	
15	Lyon Duchère (R)	32	9	8	15	40	51	−11	67	Relegation to Championnat de France amateur 2
16	Monts d'Or Azergues (R)	32	4	10	18	34	67	−33	54	Relegation to Championnat de France amateur 2
17	Louhans-Cuiseaux (R)	32	2	1	29	13	84	−71	39	Relegation to Championnat de France amateur 2

Updated to match(es) played on 28 May 2011. Source: French Football Federation
Rules for classification: 1) points; 2) goal difference; 3) number of goals scored.
(P) Promoted; (R) Relegated

==== Results ====
Home \ Away	AMN	AUX	BLF	BSC	BPE	EPI	IVR	JUR	LCX	LYD	MDF	MUL	NCY	PSGR	RLE	SCX	VFR
Amnéville		2–2	1–0	2–1	4–1	0–3	2–2	3–0	3–0	1–1	4–4	1–1	2–0	3–1	3–0	0–2	0–4
Auxerre Reserves	0–1		1–1	0–2	1–1	2–2	1–2	3–0	4–0	2–0	1–1	0–0	1–3	4–2	2–2	2–2	0–1
Belfort	0–1	0–1		2–2	2–2	0–0	1–3	3–0	3–0	2–2	0–2	1–0	1–0	1–0	1–2	2–1	2–0
Besançon	1–1	0–0	1–0		0–2	1–1	2–0	0–0	1–0	0–0	1–1	2–0	2–0	2–0	3–0	1–0	2–1
Bourg-Péronnas	3–1	2–1	3–2	1–2		1–1	0–0	0–3	3–0	1–1	5–3	3–0	2–2	2–2	2–2	2–2	2–1
Épinal	0–0	3–3	1–0	4–2	1–0		0–0	0–0	5–1	1–1	5–0	1–1	1–0	1–0	2–0	1–0	0–0
Ivry	1–0	0–0	0–0	2–0	1–1	0–2		3–2	3–0	4–1	4–0	1–1	4–1	3–2	3–1	0–0	2–1
Jura Sud	0–1	1–0	1–0	2–3	2–0	1–1	1–5		5–1	1–0	3–1	2–1	0–3	0–5	1–0	3–0	3–0
Louhans-Cuiseaux	0–3	0–2	1–2	0–1	1–4	2–1	2–3	0–2		2–1	0–3	0–3	1–2	0–5	0–2	0–3	0–2
Lyon Duchère	0–0	0–1	1–0	1–2	1–2	1–2	1–1	2–0	1–0		4–1	0–3	1–2	2–0	1–0	3–2	1–1
Monts d'Or Azergues	1–2	1–3	1–2	1–1	0–0	1–2	0–0	0–0	3–1	1–3		2–2	2–1	1–4	0–1	1–3	1–2
Mulhouse	4–2	0–2	1–1	1–1	1–2	0–0	2–1	2–0	1–0	3–2	3–0		2–2	5–2	2–2	2–2	1–1
Nancy Reserves	2–2	0–0	1–1	0–1	4–0	1–1	3–0	0–0	2–0	4–1	1–1	3–3		0–2	4–0	3–0	2–1
Paris Saint-Germain Reserves	2–2	0–0	2–2	0–1	1–0	2–2	1–0	2–0	0–0	6–1	2–1	0–0	2–1		4–1	3–1	2–0
Raon-l'Étape	2–1	0–0	1–1	0–2	1–2	1–1	2–2	1–0	5–1	1–3	1–1	3–0	1–1	1–0		1–2	1–1
Sochaux Reserves	3–0	2–0	0–0	0–1	3–1	0–3	1–0	1–2	4–0	2–1	4–0	1–0	4–0	1–0	2–1		1–0
Villefranche	4–1	1–2	2–0	0–0	2–0	1–3	0–3	1–0	3–0	2–1	2–0	4–0	1–0	3–1	1–3	2–0	

Updated to match(es) played on 28 May 2011. Source: French Football Federation
Legend: Blue = home team win; Yellow = draw; Red = away team win.

=== Group C ===
Pos	Team	Pld	W	D	L	GF	GA	GD	Pts	Promotion or relegation
1	Gazélec Ajaccio (C, P)	34	20	8	6	51	32	+19	102	Promotion to Championnat National
2	Martigues	34	17	13	4	57	28	+29	98	
3	Pau	34	17	10	7	56	33	+23	95	
4	Lyon Reserves	34	13	14	7	53	41	+12	87	Championnat de France amateur Playoffs
5	Monaco Reserves	34	12	14	8	49	41	+8	84	
6	Toulon	34	13	10	11	41	40	+1	83	
7	Albi	34	13	6	15	44	49	−5	79	
8	Colomiers	34	11	12	11	46	40	+6	79	
9	Saint-Étienne Reserves	34	12	9	13	50	46	+4	79	
10	Hyères	34	10	14	10	47	47	0	78	
11	Le Pontet	34	11	11	12	61	63	−2	78	
12	Uzès Pont du Gard	34	10	12	12	38	40	−2	76	
13	Agde	34	11	8	15	37	46	−9	75	
14	Marignane	34	10	10	14	28	36	−8	74	
15	Tarbes	34	10	9	15	38	42	−4	73	
16	Béziers (R)	34	10	9	15	42	51	−9	73	Relegation to Championnat de France amateur 2
17	Aurillac (R)	34	7	8	19	33	57	−24	63	Relegation to Championnat de France amateur 2
18	Genêts Anglet (R)	34	6	9	19	32	68	−36	61	Relegation to Championnat de France amateur 2

Updated to match(es) played on 28 May 2011. Source: French Football Federation
Rules for classification: 1) points; 2) goal difference; 3) number of goals scored.
(C) Champions; (P) Promoted; (R) Relegated

==== Results ====
Home \ Away	AGD	ALB	AUR	BEZ	CLM	GAZ	GAN	HYR	LPT	LYO	MAR	MRT	MON	PAU	SET	TRB	TOU	UZE
Agde		1–4	1–0	0–0	1–4	2–2	2–1	1–0	5–1	1–0	2–1	0–2	1–1	0–1	3–3	2–3	3–1	1–0
Albi	0–2		3–0	1–1	0–1	1–1	3–1	1–0	3–2	1–2	0–0	0–1	0–2	1–2	1–0	3–0	1–0	4–3
Aurillac	0–1	0–2		2–0	3–2	1–2	3–1	1–0	0–3	1–1	1–0	0–2	2–0	2–2	1–2	3–4	2–2	1–2
Béziers	2–0	1–0	4–2		1–2	5–1	0–2	3–0	0–4	2–2	2–1	1–1	1–1	0–1	1–1	1–0	1–3	1–3
Colomiers	1–1	0–1	1–0	3–1		1–0	6–0	0–0	1–1	2–2	0–1	3–3	1–1	0–2	2–1	1–1	2–3	1–1
Gazélec Ajaccio	1–0	2–1	2–0	1–0	0–0		1–1	2–1	5–0	2–1	3–0	1–0	2–1	1–0	5–0	2–0	4–1	2–0
Genêts Anglet	2–0	0–2	1–1	0–2	1–2	0–1		1–1	2–3	2–2	0–0	0–3	3–3	1–2	1–1	0–2	1–1	1–3
Hyères	1–1	3–3	1–1	3–1	0–2	1–1	3–1		4–1	3–2	1–1	0–0	1–0	1–1	4–2	3–1	2–1	1–1
Le Pontet	3–0	6–2	2–2	2–2	3–1	5–0	0–1	0–0		2–2	1–2	1–1	2–1	0–0	2–2	1–0	0–1	3–2
Lyon Reserves	2–1	1–1	1–1	2–1	2–2	0–0	3–0	2–1	5–2		3–1	1–1	4–1	0–1	1–0	3–1	1–0	2–0
Marignane	0–0	1–0	0–1	2–1	1–0	0–1	3–2	1–2	1–1	1–0		0–0	0–1	3–0	1–0	1–1	0–1	2–1
Martigues	2–0	2–2	2–0	0–2	3–0	6–1	2–1	3–3	1–1	3–1	1–1		1–1	3–2	2–2	1–0	0–1	2–1
Monaco Reserves	2–1	3–0	3–1	2–2	1–0	1–1	0–1	2–2	3–2	0–0	1–0	2–1		1–1	3–3	2–2	1–1	1–1
Pau	1–0	4–0	2–0	3–0	1–1	1–0	5–0	1–2	7–2	1–1	3–1	0–1	1–0		3–1	1–1	2–0	1–1
Saint-Étienne Reserves	2–2	0–1	3–0	2–0	2–0	1–1	5–1	4–2	1–3	3–0	2–0	0–1	0–4	3–0		0–0	1–0	2–0
Tarbes	2–1	2–1	2–0	2–0	0–2	0–1	0–1	1–1	3–0	2–3	2–0	0–0	1–2	1–1	0–1		2–0	1–2
Toulon	1–0	2–0	3–1	1–1	1–3	0–2	1–1	3–0	2–1	1–1	2–2	0–3	1–0	2–0	3–0	1–1		0–0
Uzès Pont du Gard	0–1	3–1	0–0	1–2	0–0	1–0	3–0	1–0	1–1	0–0	0–0	0–3	1–2	3–3	1–0	1–0	1–1	

Updated to match(es) played on 28 May 2011. Source: French Football Federation
Legend: Blue = home team win; Yellow = draw; Red = away team win.

=== Group D ===
Pos	Team	Pld	W	D	L	GF	GA	GD	Pts	Promotion or relegation
1	Le Poiré-sur-Vie (P)	32	16	11	5	47	23	+24	91	Promotion to Championnat National
2	Cherbourg	32	12	13	7	42	37	+5	81	
3	La Vitréenne	32	11	15	6	39	26	+13	80	
4	Carquefou	32	12	10	10	42	36	+6	78	
5	Les Herbiers	32	12	10	10	48	36	+12	78	
6	Yzeure	32	11	11	10	30	26	+4	76	
7	Moulins	32	11	11	10	42	43	−1	76	
8	Avranches	32	9	15	8	32	31	+1	74	
9	Viry-Châtillon	32	11	9	12	36	39	−3	74	
10	Le Mans Reserves	32	10	12	10	44	38	+6	74	Championnat de France amateur Playoffs
11	Romorantin	32	11	8	13	43	43	0	73	
12	Vendée Luçon	32	9	13	10	36	43	−7	72	
13	Lorient Reserves	32	10	9	13	39	42	−3	71	
14	Vendée Fontenay	32	9	12	11	34	43	−9	71	
15	Caen Reserves (R)	32	8	14	10	40	55	−15	70	Relegation to Championnat de France amateur 2
16	Saint-Pryvé Saint-Hilaire (R)	32	11	3	18	40	53	−13	68	Relegation to Championnat de France amateur 2
17	Rennes Reserves (R)	32	7	8	17	27	45	−18	61	Relegation to Championnat de France amateur 2

Updated to match(es) played on 28 May 2011. Source: French Football Federation
Rules for classification: 1) points; 2) goal difference; 3) number of goals scored.
(P) Promoted; (R) Relegated

==== Results ====
Home \ Away	AVR	CAE	CQF	CHB	VIT	LMN	LPV	LHB	LOR	MOU	REN	RMA	SPH	VFF	VLF	VYC	YZE
Avranches		0–0	1–4	1–1	0–0	1–0	0–0	1–4	1–1	2–1	1–0	2–1	1–3	1–1	0–1	0–0	0–1
Caen Reserves	1–0		1–2	0–3	3–2	3–4	1–1	3–2	2–0	1–1	0–0	0–2	3–1	1–1	1–1	0–0	0–5
Carquefou	1–0	2–2		3–5	0–1	3–3	0–2	0–0	1–0	1–1	0–1	0–0	3–1	2–2	2–3	2–2	2–0
Cherbourg	4–2	0–2	2–1		1–1	1–0	0–0	3–1	0–0	2–2	3–1	1–1	2–0	0–0	1–1	0–1	0–0
La Vitréenne	1–1	3–3	2–0	0–0		1–1	0–1	2–2	0–0	2–0	1–0	4–0	5–0	2–0	1–1	2–2	1–0
Le Mans Reserves	1–1	1–1	1–0	3–1	0–0		1–2	2–1	2–3	4–1	3–1	1–3	3–1	1–1	1–1	0–0	0–1
Le Poiré-sur-Vie	0–0	3–0	1–1	3–0	1–0	1–0		2–1	1–1	0–0	3–0	2–0	0–0	1–2	1–1	1–2	3–0
Les Herbiers	0–0	6–0	0–2	3–0	0–0	1–1	1–3		0–0	1–0	2–1	2–2	1–0	4–1	4–1	2–1	1–0
Lorient Reserves	1–2	2–2	0–1	3–1	0–0	0–0	0–4	1–2		0–2	0–1	3–2	0–1	5–1	2–1	1–1	1–2
Moulins	2–4	1–1	0–0	0–2	1–1	0–2	2–0	2–1	1–2		2–1	3–2	3–2	4–2	2–2	2–0	0–0
Rennes Reserves	0–1	0–1	1–0	0–2	0–0	1–4	3–2	0–1	5–3	1–1		1–1	2–1	0–0	0–1	2–1	0–1
Romorantin	0–3	1–1	0–3	0–0	2–3	2–2	5–1	1–0	3–2	2–3	2–0		0–1	3–0	2–0	1–0	1–0
Saint-Pryvé Saint-Hilaire	0–0	5–3	1–2	2–3	2–0	2–1	0–2	2–0	0–2	3–4	1–1	1–2		1–0	2–0	2–0	3–0
Vendée Fontenay	0–0	1–1	0–1	0–2	1–0	2–0	1–1	0–0	1–3	1–0	1–0	2–1	2–0		2–2	1–2	1–1
Vendée Luçon	1–1	0–1	2–1	1–1	2–3	1–1	1–2	1–1	1–0	0–1	1–1	1–1	4–2	0–3		1–0	2–1
Viry-Châtillon	0–4	3–1	0–1	4–1	2–0	1–0	1–3	4–3	1–2	1–0	1–1	1–0	2–0	2–2	0–1		0–0
Yzeure	1–1	2–1	1–1	1–1	0–1	0–1	0–0	1–1	0–1	0–0	2–2	1–0	2–0	2–0	2–0	3–1	

Updated to match(es) played on 28 May 2011. Source: French Football Federation
Legend: Blue = home team win; Yellow = draw; Red = away team win.

== Playoffs ==
Semifinals
1	Lyon	2
4	Sochaux	1
2	Metz	1
3	Le Mans	2

Finals
1	Lyon	2
3	Le Mans	1

=== Semi-finals ===
31 May	Lyon	2–1	Sochaux	Plaine des Jeux Gerland, Lyon
18:00 CEST	Novillo 57', 65'	Report	Pereira 45'	Referee: Gerard Dany

31 May	Metz	1–2 (a.e.t.)	Le Mans	Stade Saint-Symphorien, Metz
18:00 CEST	Keita 37'	Report	Vergerolle 79'; Derouard 119'	Referee: Emmanuel Caron

=== Final ===
3 June	Lyon	2–1	Le Mans	Stade Daniel Soyer, La Suze-sur-Sarthe
16:30 CEST	Blanc 15'; Novillo 29'	Report	Djeddou 28'	Referee: Bastien Dechepy

== Top goalscorers ==
Last updated: 7 March 2011

Group A
Rank	Scorer	Club	Goals
1	(France) Rémy Dugimont	Poissy	10
1	(France) Riyad Mahrez	Le Havre B	10
3	(France) Stéphane Boulila	Aubervilliers	8
3	(France) Steve Marlet	Aubervilliers	8
3	(France) Romain Pastorelli	CA Bastia	8
6	(France) Joris Colinet	Quevilly	7
7	(France) Nourdine Aguini	Quevilly	6
7	(France) Kossingou Balamandji	Villemomble	6
9	(France) Rémy Arnoux	CA Bastia	5
9	(France) Pierrick Capelle	Avion	5

Group B
Rank	Scorer	Club	Goals
1	(France) Khalid Souhayli	Mulhouse	11
2	(Portugal) Bruno Barreto	Villefranche	9
3	(France) Jean Bahebeck	Paris SG B	8
3	(France) Boris Berraud	Bourg-Péronnas	8
3	(France) Júlio Tavares	Bourg-Péronnas	8
6	(France) Sébastien Chéré	Épinal	7
6	(France) Mustapha Louhkiar	Mulhouse	7
8	(France) Romain Barbet	Bourg-Péronnas	6
8	(France) Kalen Damessi	Jura Sud	6
8	(Portugal) Rafaël Dias	Sochaux B	6

Group C
Rank	Scorer	Club	Goals
1	(France) Samir Benmeziane	Le Pontet	15
2	(France) Jean-Mathieu Descamps	Martigues	11
2	(France) Tony Do Pilar Patrao	Hyères	11
2	(Ivory Coast) Seydou Koné	Pau	11
5	(France) Yannick Chabaud	Le Pontet	9
5	(France) Grégory Firquet	Toulon	9
5	(Algeria) Malik Rouag	Albi	9
8	(France) Florian Raspentino	Agde	8
8	(France) Idriss Saadi	Saint-Étienne B	8
10	(France) Quentin Boesso	Gazélec Ajaccio	7

Group D
Rank	Scorer	Club	Goals
1	(Senegal) Adama Sarr	Lorient	10
2	(France) Jonathan Béhé	Le Mans B	9
3	(Morocco) Farid El Alagui	Romorantin	8
3	(France) Romain Dupuy	Les Herbiers	8
5	(France) Walid Aïchour	Viry-Châtillon	7
5	(France) Gaëtan Courtet	Lorient B	7
5	(France) Martin Garot	La Vitréenne	7
5	(France) Florian Martin	Lorient B	7
5	(France) Benjamin Morel	Caen B	7
5	(France) Aurélien Gazeau	Le Poiré-sur-Vie	7
