= Descamps =

Descamps is a French surname. Notable people with the surname include:

- Béatrice Descamps (born 1951), French politician and a former member of the Senate of France
- Édouard Descamps (1847–1933), Belgian jurist and politician
- Françoise Descamps-Crosnier (born 1955), member of the National Assembly of France
- Guillaume Descamps (1779-1858), French painter and engraver
- Jean-Baptiste Descamps (1714–1791), French writer on art and artists, and painter of village scenes
- Jean-Mathieu Descamps (born 1983), French football player
- Joseph Jules Descamps (1820–1892), Belgian liberal politician
- Marie-Hélène Descamps (1938–2020), French politician and Member of the European Parliament
- Marius Descamps (1924-1996), French entomologist
- Nathalie Descamps (born 1983), Belgian badminton player
- Patrick Descamps (born 1956), Belgian actor and stage director
- Pierre Descamps (1916–1992), Belgian politician and burgomaster
- Timo Descamps (born 1986), Belgian actor, voice actor and singer

== See also ==
- Descamps 17, a French 1923 two seat reconnaissance fighter
- Descamps 27, a French 1919 two bay biplane
- Descamps v. United States, a 2013 case regarding prior offenses under the Armed Career Criminal Act
