= Kayombo =

Kayombo is a Congolese surname. Notable people with the surname include:

- Gaudence Kayombo (born 1955), Tanzanian politician
- Teddy Kayombo (born 1991), French football centre-back
- Axel Kayombo (born 2006), Congolese football winger
