= Jordan Faucher =

French footballer (born 1991)

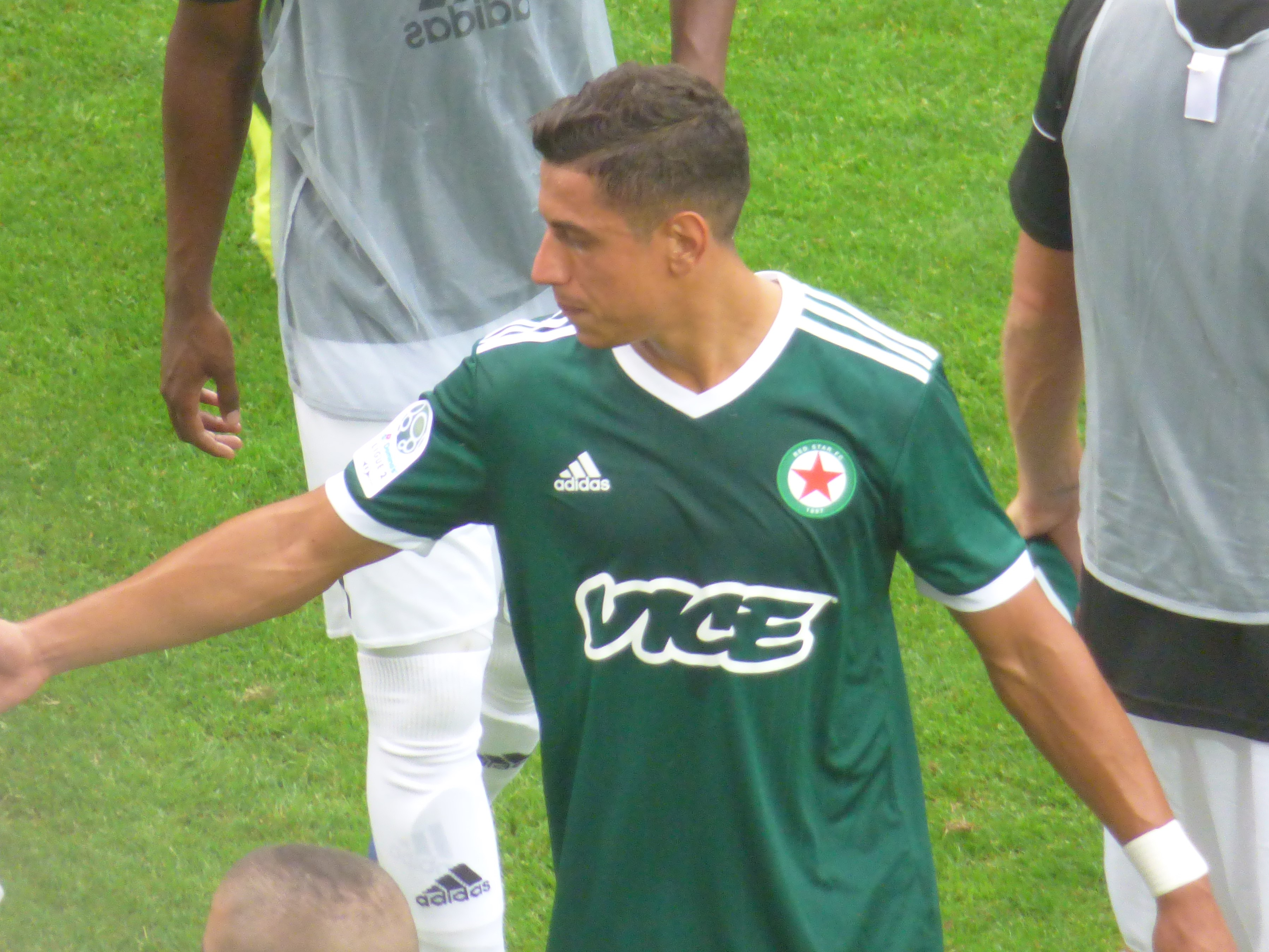
- Faucher in 2018

Personal information
- Full name: Sadek Jordan Chebel Faucher
- Date of birth: 6 November 1991 (age 34)
- Place of birth: Créteil, France
- Height: 1.78 m (5 ft 10 in)
- Position: Forward

Youth career
- –2010: Metz

Senior career*
Years	Team	Apps	(Gls)
2010–2011	Tours	3	(1)
2011–2012	Tournai	21	(10)
2012–2014	Antwerp	39	(10)
2014–2017	Maccabi Herzliya	103	(67)
2017–2018	Hapoel Ra'anana	22	(4)
2018	Bnei Sakhnin	14	(7)
2018–2019	Red Star	22	(5)
2019–2020	Xanthi	26	(7)
2020–2022	Waasland-Beveren	20	(3)
2022	→ Virton (loan)	3	(0)
2022–2023	Hapoel Acre	16	(3)
- * Club domestic league appearances and goals as of 15 June 2023

Sadek Jordan Chebel Faucher (born 6 November 1991) is a French professional footballer who plays as a forward.

== Club career ==
=== Metz ===
On 1 May 2010, Faucher won the 2009–10 Coupe Gambardella with the Metz under-19 team, scoring a goal in the final against Sochaux. He also scored goals in the two previous rounds against Sedan and Lyon.

=== Tours ===
On 9 June 2010, Faucher left FC Metz to sign a contract with Tours.

On 17 December 2010, Faucher made his professional debut for Tours in a Ligue 2 match against Nîmes Olympique coming on a substitute in the 73rd minute. Four days later, he scored his first goal for the club in a game against Angers.

=== Maccabi Herzliya ===
From 2014 until 2017 Faucher played for Maccabi Herzliya.

=== Red Star ===
In August 2018, Faucher joined Red Star, newly promoted to Ligue 2, on a two-year contract.

=== Xanthi ===
On 11 July 2019, Xanthi officially announced the acquisition of the French striker on a free transfer. On 29 September 2019, he scored his first goal for the club in a 3–1 home win against Volos. On 5 October 2019, he scored in the dying minutes of an away match against Panathinaikos, to give his team a 1–0 win, which was the fifth in the first six matches.

On 5 January 2020, Faucher scored a brace within two minutes, to give his team a 2–1 home win against AEL. On 14 January 2020, his goal against Aris was not enough for his team to qualify for the quarter finals of the Greek Cup, as Xanthi lost 3–1 on aggregate. On 26 January 2020, he scored a brace, one of those in the second minute of second-half stoppage time to give Xanthi a point in a 2–2 home draw against OFI.

=== Virton ===
On 31 January 2022, Faucher was loaned to Virton.

== International career ==
Despite being born in France, Algerian newspaper El Watan indicated that Faucher wanted to play for Algeria in international competition, following in the footsteps of his uncle Fathi Chebal.

== Personal life ==
Faucher is the nephew of former Algerian international Fathi Chebal who played at the 1986 FIFA World Cup.

== Honours ==
=== Club ===
Metz

- Coupe Gambardella: 2009–10

=== Individual ===
- Liga Leumit top goalscorer: 2015–16 (21 goals), 2016–17 (24 goals)
