= Plaisir Bahamboula =

French footballer and musical artist (born 1991)

Personal information
- Full name: Plaisir Dieunael Moyo Bahamboula
- Date of birth: 8 January 1991 (age 35)
- Place of birth: Corbeil, France
- Height: 1.91 m (6 ft 3 in)
- Position: Midfielder

Youth career
- 2001–2004: US Grigny
- 2004–2005: Linas-Montlhéry
- 2005–2010: Sochaux

Senior career*
Years	Team	Apps	(Gls)
2008–2011	Sochaux B	34	(3)
2011	Antwerp	0	(0)
2012–2013	Viry-Châtillon	3	(0)
2013	MyPa	7	(0)
2013–2014	Slavia Sofia	1	(0)
2015	Viry-Châtillon	9	(0)
2016	Sénart-Moissy	3	(0)
Total		57	(3)

International career
2010	France U19	3	(1)
- * Club domestic league appearances and goals

Plaisir Moyo Bahamboula (born 8 January 1991) is a French former professional footballer who played as a midfielder. He is now a musical artist and social media influencer, and his stage name is OhPlai.

== Club career ==
Bahamboula played for US Grigny, Linas-Montlhéry, and Sochaux in his youth career. He would go on to play 34 games and score 3 goals for the B team of Sochaux from 2008 to 2011. He would then successively play for Royal Antwerp, Viry-Châtillon, MyPa, Slavia Sofia, and Viry-Châtillon again from 2011 to 2015, making sporadic appearances along the way.

In January 2016, Bahamboula signed for Sénart-Moissy. In the second half of the 2015–16 season, he would make a total of 3 appearances. He would decide to retire at the end of the season.

== International career ==
Born in France, Bahamboula was of Congolese descent. He was a youth player for France at U19 level. He was part of the same generation of footballers as Alexandre Lacazette and Clément Grenier. Bahamboula made only 3 appearances and scored 1 goal for the team.

== Post-playing career ==
After retiring from football, Bahamboula pursued a career in making humorous videos on social media. He would gain over 1 million followers across several platforms. He would also become a musical artist, and made several music videos.

== Personal life ==
Plaisir’s younger brothers Dylan, Dolan, and his cousin Jason Bahamboula are footballers. His cousin Yven Moyo is a professional footballer as well.

Bahamboula is muslim.

== Honours ==
Sochaux U19

- Coupe Gambardella runner-up: 2009–10
