= 2009–10 Coupe Gambardella =

The 2009–10 Coupe Gambardella was the 55th edition of the French cup competition reserved for male under-19 football players. The competition is organized by the French Football Federation. The final was contested on 1 May 2010 at the Stade de France and served as a curtain raiser for the 2009–10 Coupe de France final. The defending champions were Montpellier, who defeated Nantes 2–0 in the 2008–09 edition of the competition. The current champions are Metz who won the competition by defeating Sochaux 4–3 on penalties in the final after the match ended 1–1 in 90 minutes.

== Calendar ==
On 17 August 2009, the French Football Federation announced the calendar for the Coupe Gambardella.

Round	First match date	Fixtures	Clubs	Notes
Regional finals	22 November 2009			
First Round	13 December 2009			
Second Round	10 January 2010			
Round of 64	31 January 2010			
Round of 32	21 February 2010	16	32 → 16	
Round of 16	14 March 2010	8	16 → 8	
Quarter-finals	4 April 2010	4	8 → 4	
Semi-finals	18 April 2010	2	4 → 2	
Final	1 May 2010	1	2 → 1	Final at the Stade de France.

== First round ==
The draw for the first round of Coupe Gambardella was conducted on 26 November 2009 at the headquarters of the French Football Federation, in Paris by French referee Bertrand Layec. The matches were contested on 13 December 2009. The postponed matches were played on 3 January 2010.

Tie no	Home team	Score	Away team
1	Aulnoye	3 – 2	Douai
2	Béthune	3 – 0	Saint-Denis
3	Dunkerque	3 – 0	Les Lilas
4	Aulnay	1 – 0	Avion
5	Orchies	1 – 0	Armentières
6	Paris	6 – 0	Loos
7	Waziers	0 – 3	Boulogne-Billancourt
8	Saint-Quentin	1 – 2	Roye
9	Brétigny	5 – 1	Saint-Omer
10	Sannois Saint-Gratien	1 – 0	Rouen
11	Mont-Saint-Aignan	0 – 1	Évreux
12	Amiens PTT	1 – 0	Deauville
13	Boulogne	3 – 0	Dreux
14	Fleury Mérogis	2 – 1	Le Havre Municipaux
15	Mondeville	2 – 0	Colombes
16	Chantilly	1 – 0	Etaples
17	Cherbourg	2 – 3	Guécélard
18	Laval	4 – 0	Saint-Lô Manche
19	Pontivy	3 – 1	Thaon
20	Saint Jouan	1 – 0	Pont l'Abbé
21	Ernée	2 – 2 (aet); 4–3 p.	Stade Pontivy
22	CPB Rennes	0 – 0 (aet); 4–5 p.	Vitré
23	AS Brest	0 – 1	Fougères
24	Stade Brest	7 – 0	Plouzané
25	Châtellerault	1 – 0	La Roche-sur-Yon
26	Vendée Fontenay	0 – 0 (aet); 3–4 p.	Avenir Theix
27	Vannes Menimur	0 – 0 (aet); 4–3 p.	Intrépide Angers
28	Vertou	2 – 1	Bourges
29	Saint Nazaire	2 – 3	Rochefort
30	Cholet	4 – 0	Montreuil Juignebene
31	Olonne-sur-Mer	0 – 4	Châteaubriant
32	ASPTT Limoges	0 – 1	Cognac
33	Luc Primaube	1 – 2	Limoges
34	Langon-Castets	1 – 2	Toulouse Fontaines
35	Trélissac	1 – 0	Balma
36	Quand Même Orleix	0 – 2	Bayonne
37	Rodez	2 – 0	Bordelais

Tie no	Home team	Score	Away team
38	Castres	2 – 0	Albi
39	Tournefeuille	0 – 3	Bergerac
40	Aixe-sur-Vienne	w/o	Exemption
41	Gignac	1 – 0	Seyssinet
42	US Marseille	1 – 4	Fréjus Saint-Raphaël
43	Hyères	1 – 1 (aet); 12–13 p.	Frontignan
44	SMUC Marseille	1 – 1 (aet); 3–1 p.	Aubagne
45	Exemption	w/o	Conques
46	Perpignan	0 – 1 (aet)	Castelnau-le-Crès
47	Vergèze	0 – 3	Istres
48	Roquebrune-Cap-Martin	1 – 2	Saint Rémy
49	Évian	3 – 1	US Vénissieux
50	Jura Sud	1 – 1 (aet); 5–4 p.	Caluire
51	Dommartin Tour	6 – 1	Yzeure
52	Mâcon	2 - 3	Aurillac
53	Riom	0 – 1	Saint-Priest
54	Haut Pilat	1 – 3	Rhône Vallées
55	Villefontaine	4 – 1	Moulins
56	Tassin la 1/2 Lune	0 – 1	Villeurbanne
57	Villefranche	1 – 0	Mulhouse
58	Essegney Langley	0 – 9	Sélestat Portugais
59	ASPTT Dijon	1 – 1 (aet); 5–4 p.	Colmar
60	Épinal	1 - 0	Illzach Modenheim
61	Herrlisheim	1 – 3	Réunis Saint Marcel
62	Illkirch-Graffenstaden	5 – 0	Belfort
63	Haguenau	0 – 1	Vesoul
64	Saverne	1 – 4	Châlon
65	Noisy-le-Sec	1 – 3	Sénart-Moissy
66	Jarville Jeunes	2 – 0	Montargis
67	Reims Saint-Anne	1 – 2	Amilly
68	Clouange	1 – 2	Taissy
69	Courtisols Estan	2 – 0	APM Metz
70	Pagny-sur-Moselle	0 – 2	ASPTT Châlons
71	Blénod	0 – 0 (aet); 5–4 p.	Toul
72	Le Mée	0 - 2	Thionville

== Second round ==
The draw for the second round of the Coupe Gambardella was conducted on 17 December 2009 at the headquarters of the French Football Federation, in Paris by France national under-19 football team coach Francis Smerecki. The matches were contested on 9 January 2010. The postponed matches were played on 16 and 17 January and the matches that were postponed on those days were played on 20 January with the final match of the round being played on 24 January.

Tie no	Home team	Score	Away team
1	Amiens PTT	2 – 5	Lens
2	Boulogne	3 – 2	Valenciennes
3	Lille	4 – 0	Wasquehal
4	Roye	1 – 4	Amiens
5	Orchies	1 – 1 (aet); 2–3 p.	Dieppe
6	Sannois Saint-Gratien	1 – 2	Lesquin
7	Aulnoye	2 – 6	Dunkerque
8	Béthune	0 – 1	Chantilly
9	Amilly	0 – 2	Metz
10	Taissy	0 – 3	Magny
11	Courtisols Estan	0 – 8	Amnéville
12	Sénart-Moissy	1 – 2	Paris
13	Nancy	3 – 0	Troyes
14	Thionville	2 – 2 (aet); 4–2 p.	Fleury Mérogis
15	ASPTT Châlons	2 – 5	Aulnay
16	Reims	1 – 5	Sedan
17	Laval	1 – 0	Caen
18	Saint-Jouan	0 – 6	Brétigny
19	Évreux	0 – 2	Le Mans
20	Vitré	2 – 3	Le Havre
21	Fougères	2 – 1	Racing
22	Boulogne-Billancourt	5 – 0	Guécelard
23	Paris Saint-Germain	3 – 2	Tours
24	Mondeville	1 – 0	Avranches
25	Avenir Theix	0 – 2	Brest
26	Pontivy	0 – 2	Lorient
27	Cholet	1 – 3	Châtellerault
28	Vannes Menimur	1 – 0	Vertou
29	Vannes	6 – 0	Changé
30	Guingamp	1 – 2	Rennes
31	Ernée	0 – 9	Nantes
32	Châteaubriant	2 – 3	Angers
33	Rocherfort	1 – 5	Toulouse
34	Limoges	1 – 0	Toulouse Fontaines

Tie no	Home team	Score	Away team
35	Cognac	1 – 2	Bergerac
36	Bayonne	3 – 2	Tarbes
37	Castres	2 – 1	Trélissac
38	Mérignac	1 – 4	Niort
39	Bordeaux	2 – 0	Libourne-Saint-Seurin
40	Aixe-sur-Vienne	0 – 4	Châteauroux
41	Rodez	1 – 0	Cannes
42	Castelnau-le-Crès	0 – 4	Nice
43	Saint-Rémy	0 – 3	AS Monaco
44	SMUC Marseille	2 – 4	Istres
45	Furiani-Agliani	2 – 1	Marseille
46	Fréjus Saint-Raphaël	1 – 1 (aet); 4–2 p.	Conques
47	Frontignan	1 – 1 (aet); 5–4 p.	Gignac
48	Ajaccio	0 – 1	Bastia
49	Clermont Foot	0 – 2	Saint-Étienne
50	Évian	0 – 4	Lyon
51	Villefranche	1 – 1 (aet); 5–6 p.	Montpellier
52	Rhône Vallées	2 – 1	Saint-Priest
53	Jura Sud	2 – 2 (aet); 3–5 p.	Nîmes
54	Aurillac	1 – 1 (aet); 4–5 p.	Villeurbanne
55	Dommartin Tour	1 – 1 (aet); 6–5 p.	Montferrand
56	Villefontaine	0 – 4	Grenoble
57	Dijon	2 – 1	Besançon
58	Jarville Jeunes	1 – 1 (aet); 3–1 p.	Strasbourg
59	Sélestat Portugais	1 – 2	Réunis Saint Marcel
60	Dijon	0 – 4	Gueugnon
61	Blénod	0 – 5	Auxerre
62	Illkirch-Graffenstaden	2 – 0	Vesoul
63	Châlon	2 – 2 (aet); 2–0 p.	Épinal
64	Sochaux	11 – 0	Orléans

== Round of 64 ==
The draw for the Round of 64 of the Coupe Gambardella was conducted on 14 January 2010 at the headquarters of the French Football Federation, in Paris by the president of the Ligue du Football Amateur Fernand Duchaussoy and Jean-Pierre Dubédat, a member of the board of directors of the Ligue du Football Amateur. The matches will be played on 31 January 2010.

Tie no	Home team	Score	Away team
1	Boulogne-Billancourt	0 – 2	Le Mans
2	Le Havre	2 – 5	Lens
3	Chantilly	4 – 2	Dunkerque
4	Laval	4 – 0	Fougères
5	Lesquin	1 – 4	Amiens
6	Dieppe	1 – 1 (aet); 6–5 p.	Brétigny
7	Mondeville	1 – 1 (aet); 4–2 p.	Paris Saint-Germain
8	Lille	2 – 1	Boulogne
9	Gueugnon	1 – 1 (aet); 6–5 p.	Nancy
10	Auxerre	2 – 3	Paris
11	Thionville	0 – 5	Metz
12	Dijon	2 – 5	Sochaux
13	Jarville	0 – 3	Sedan
14	Aulnay	0 – 1	Épinal
15	Amnéville	3 – 1	Illkirch-Graffenstaden
16	Réunis Saint Marcel	1 – 1 (aet); 1–3 p.	Magny

Tie no	Home team	Score	Away team
17	Rennes	3 – 0	Vannes
18	Bergerac	0 – 2	Lorient
19	Limoges	0 – 2	Toulouse
20	Castres	1 – 2	Bordeaux
21	Nantes	2 – 0	Brest
22	Châtellerault	2 – 2 (aet); 5–4 p.	Châteauroux
23	Bayonne	1 – 3	Niort
24	Vannes Menimur	1 – 3	Angers
25	Fréjus Saint-Raphaël	1 – 1 (aet); 3–1 p.	Bastia
26	Grenoble	0 – 0 (aet); 7–8 p.	Dommartin Tour
27	Rodez	1 – 1 (aet); 6–7 p.	Villeurbanne
28	Istres	2 – 2 (aet); 4–5 p.	Saint-Étienne
29	Rhône Vallées	2 – 1	Nice
30	AS Monaco	3 – 0	Frontignan
31	Montpellier	1 – 0	Furiani-Agliani
32	Nîmes	2 – 3	Lyon

== Round of 32 ==
The draw for the Round of 32 of the Coupe Gambardella was conducted on 4 February 2010 at the headquarters of Crédit Agricole, who sponsor the competition, in Paris by the France national football team manager Raymond Domenech and a host of members of the Ligue du Football Amateur, including the president Fernand Duchaussoy. The matches were played on 21 February.

Tie no	Home team	Score	Away team
1	Paris	0 – 0(aet); 5–4 p.	Magny
2	Amiens	2 – 2(aet); 4–5 p.	Gueugnon
3	Lens	4 – 1	Dieppe
4	Épinal	1 – 3	Sedan
5	Amnéville	1 – 0	Lille
6	Chantilly	1 – 3	Metz
7	Châtellerault	1 – 3	Angers
8	Lorient	1 – 1 (aet); 2–4 p.	Rennes

Tie no	Home team	Score	Away team
9	Nantes	3 – 2	Le Mans
10	Mondeville	0 – 2	Bordeaux
11	Laval	3 – 2	Niort
12	AS Monaco	0 – 2	Saint-Étienne
13	Villeurbanne	0 – 1	Toulouse
14	Fréjus Saint-Raphaël	0 – 4	Dommartin Tour
15	Lyon	2 – 1	Montpellier
16	Rhône Vallées	1 – 5	Sochaux

== Round of 16 ==
The draw for the Round of 16 of the Coupe Gambardella was conducted on 25 February 2010 at the Ligue de Paris-Île-de-France headquarters, in Paris, by France national under-18 football team manager Philippe Bergeroo and Jean-Claude Giuntini, a member of the Ligue du Football Amateur. The matches were played on 14 March.

Tie no	Home team	Score	Away team
1	Laval	1 – 0	Angers
2	Bordeaux	1 – 3	Nantes
3	Paris	1 – 0	Rennes
4	Toulouse	1 – 0	Lens
5	Dommartin Tour	2 – 5	Lyon

Tie no	Home team	Score	Away team
6	Gueugnon	0 – 0(aet); 4–5 p.	Sochaux
7	Sedan	1 – 0	Amnéville
8	Saint-Étienne	1 – 1(aet); 3–4 p.	Metz

== Quarterfinals ==
The draw for the Round of 16 of the Coupe Gambardella was conducted on 25 February 2010 at the headquarters of Crédit Agricole, who sponsor the competition, in Paris by French parachuting champion Nicolas Ratier. The matches were played on 4 April.

4 April
15:00 CET

Metz	3 – 3 3–2 pen.	Lyon
Kehli 2'; Simpara 35'; Faucher 75'	Report	Tafer 48'; Bourdette 80'; Belfodil 89'

Stade Baron Dufour, Metz
Referee: Benjamin Guelfucci (Ligue de Bourgogne)

4 April
15:00 CET

Laval	1 – 2	Sedan
Lhuissier 24'		Assougou 58'; Sliti 89'

Stade Louis Bechu, Laval
Referee: Florent Baconnet (Ligue Atlantique)

4 April
15:00 CET

Paris	0 – 2	Nantes
	Report	Yong-Jae 35'; Trebel 75'

Stade Marsye Hilsz, Paris
Referee: Boris Petit (Ligue de Champagne-Ardenne)

4 April
15:00 CET

Sochaux	2 – 1	Toulouse
Dias 7' (pen.), 23'	Report	Soukouna 62'

Stade Rene Blum, Montbéliard
Referee: Gauthier Leggeri (Ligue de Lorraine)

== Semi-finals ==
The draw for the Round of 16 of the Coupe Gambardella was conducted on 25 February 2010 at the headquarters of Crédit Agricole, who sponsor the competition, in Paris by French parachuting champion Nicolas Ratier. The matches will be played on 18 April.

18 April
15:00 CET

Sochaux	4 – 1	Nantes
Dias 7', 60' (pen.); Bakambu 16', 73'	Report	Nego 25'

Stade de Baradel, Aurillac
Attendance: 500
Referee: Anthony Sarde (Ligue de Midi-Pyrénées)

18 April
17:30 CET

Sedan	1 – 3	Metz
Goal	Report	Kehli; Faucher; Croizet

Stade de Baradel, Aurillac
Referee: Éric Wattellier (Ligue du Languedoc-Roussillon)

== Final ==
1 May 2010
17:15 CET

Sochaux	1–1	Metz
Bakambu 39'	Report	Faucher 53'
Penalties
Giraud (penalty missed); Gürler (penalty missed); Bakambu (penalty scored); Dias (penalty scored); Pereira (penalty scored)	3 – 4	(penalty missed) Kayombo; (penalty scored) N'Ganvala; (penalty scored) Ngbakoto; (penalty scored) Ferino; (penalty scored) Nya Ngatcha

Stade de France, Saint-Denis
Referee: Aurélien Petit (Ligue Rhône-Alpes)
