= Tulasne =

Tulasne is a surname of French origin. Notable people with the surname include:

- Charles Tulasne (1816–1884), French physician, mycologist and illustrator
- Edmond Tulasne (1815–1885), French botanist and mycologist
- Geoffrey Tulasne (born 1988), French footballer
- Thierry Tulasne (born 1963), French tennis player
