= Château de Hunebourg =

French castle

- Hüneburg, Hünenburg
- Dossenheim-sur-Zinsel
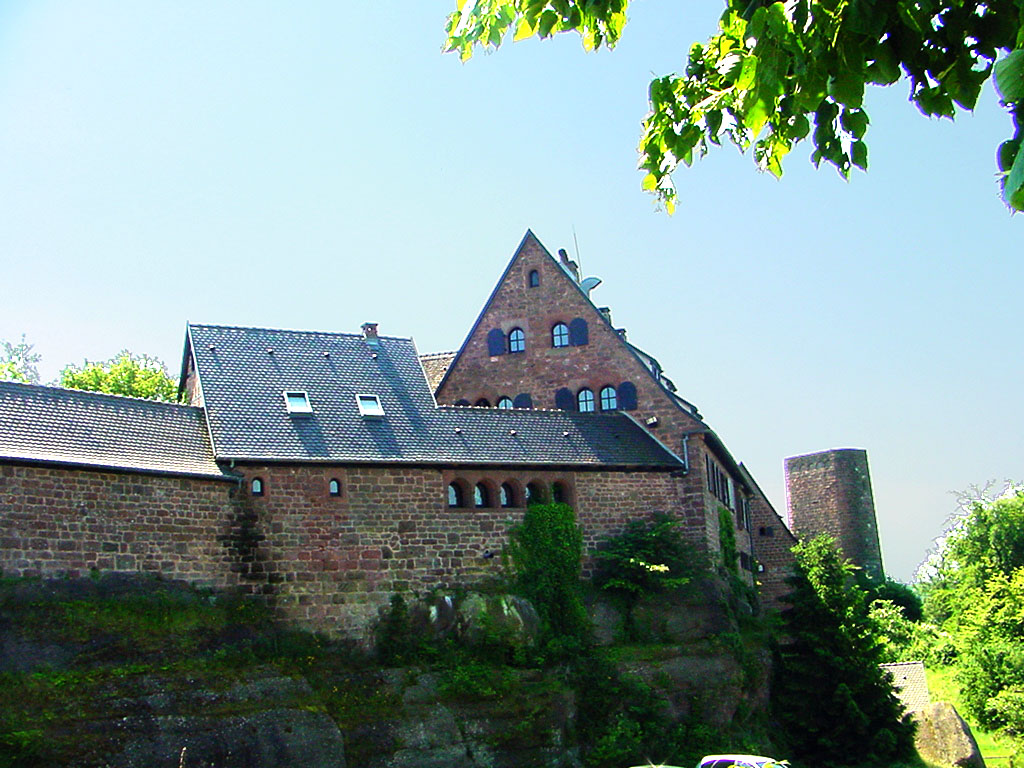
- Château de Hunebourg from the northwest

Site information
- Type: rock castle
- Code: FR-A
- Condition: partly rebuilt in modern times

Location
- Coordinates: 48°50′00″N 7°21′51″E
- Height: 425 m

Château de Hunebourg (German: Hüneburg or Hünenburg) is a rock castle that lies to the west of Neuwiller-lès-Saverne in the French département of Bas-Rhin on a 425-metre-high sandstone rock outcrop. It is accessible from the valley of the Zinsel du Nord. The original castle was built in the 12th-13th century, but very little remains from this period. The castle was reconstructed in a neo-romanesque style in the 1930s. It is a listed historical monument since 2007.

== History ==
=== Middle Ages and Early Modern Period ===
The counts of Hüneburg, who probably came from a branch of the counts of Dagsburg-Metz, were mentioned in records in 1125 which prove the existence of the castle and its two first counts, Theodoric and Folmar. The lords of Hüneburg, who occupied the castle until 1225, were patrons or protectors (Schirmherren) of the abbeys of Neuwiller and Honau. The best known member of the von Hüneburg family was Conrad of Hüneburg, Bishop of Strasbourg from 1190 to 1202. In the 14th and 15th centuries the castle was a joint inheritance or Ganerben whose owners included the family of Fleckenstein and the lords of Lichtenberg. In the following centuries they were joined by the lords and counts of Hanau. There are no reliable sources for the condition of the castle after the mid-15th century. It is likely that it fell into increasing disrepair and was no longer occupied.

=== 19th century ===
The ruins were seized during the French Revolution and sold "for the good of the nation" (Biens nationaux). It was purchased in 1809 by Napoleonic general, Henri Jacques Guillaume Clarke, who henceforth named himself the Count of Hunebourg (Comte de Hunebourg). He had the medieval bergfried torn down to make way for material for new building work. However, he spent very little time at Hunebourg. The estate was turned into a park with a hunting lodge. After the death of the general in 1818, the Hunebourg was sold by his heirs and was owned by the Feyler family of Neuwiller-lès-Saverne from 1823 to 1932.

=== 20th century ===
In 1932, an Alsatian autonomist and politician, Friedrich Spieser, purchased the castle ruins and in 1934 had new residential buildings and a bergfried built in the Neo-Romanesque style by Karl Erich Loebell, an architect of the Stuttgart School and student of Paul Schmitthenner. In his autobiographical account, A Thousand Bridges (Tausend Brücken) Spieser described the principles of his reconstruction: a commitment to the history, connectedness with nature, simplicity and objectivity in its features, authenticity of materials, orientation to German building tradition. A "hiking hostel" (youth hostel) was later integrated into the castle. The new bergfried was built on the small rock outcrop of the old inner ward, separated from the plateau of the outer ward by a ravine bridged by an arch. Unlike its medieval precursor it was not placed in the forward position of the outer ward, but moved to the other end of the rock. A "Peace Tower" (Friedens-Turm) was dedicated to "the most unknown soldiers of 1914-18 World War / the fallen of Alsace-Lorraine / and dead fighters of the region". Meetings of Alsatian autonomist clubs and folk song and folk dance events organized by Spieser took place at the castle. The Francophile press of Alsace attacked the reconstructed castle in the political conflicts of the pre-war period as a "bulwark of Germanness".

At the start of the Second World War the castle was commandeered by the French authorities. After the occupation of Alsace by German troops, Spieser returned to the castle. At the request of Baden's Gauleiter and Chief of the Civil Administration in Alsace Robert Wagner, the body of the autonomist politician, Karl Roos, who had been executed in 1940, was transferred from Nancy and interred at the castle on 19 June 1941 with military honours. In the next few years the Hüneburg was to become an obligatory pilgrimage for students of German-occupied Lorraine.

After the Liberation of France and the reconquest of the Alsace by Allied troops, the Roos' sarcophagus was thrown into the moat by French troops. Where the remains of Roos are now is unknown. The castle was retaken by French troops and repossessed. The Société mutualiste du personnel de l’Enregistrement bought the site and turned it into a holiday home for its members. Today the Hunenbourg houses an hotel.

== Literature ==
- Friedrich Hünenburg (Pseudonym von Friedrich Spieser): Tausend Brücken: Eine biographische Erzählung aus dem Schicksal eines Landes. Hünenburg-Verlag, Strasbourg, Stuttgart, Stockholm, 1952.
- Groupe de Recherche sur le château de Hunebourg: Hunebourg, un rocher chargé d’histoire. Du Moyen Age à l’époque contemporaine. Société Savante d’Alsace, [Strasbourg], 1997, ISBN 2-904920-17-X (Recherches et documents. Vol. 59).
