= Mickaël Dogbé =

Association football player (born 1976)

Personal information
- Full name: Mickaël Dodzi Dogbé
- Date of birth: 28 November 1976 (age 49)
- Place of birth: Paris, France
- Height: 1.80 m (5 ft 11 in)
- Position: Forward

Youth career
- 1994–1999: Linas-Montlhéry

Senior career*
Years	Team	Apps	(Gls)
1999–2000	CS Brétigny		
2000–2002	Grenoble	62	(27)
2002–2004	Saint-Étienne	38	(2)
2003–2004	Saint-Étienne B	13	(2)
2004–2005	Rouen	19	(4)
2005–2006	Bani Yas Club	0	(0)
2006–2007	Al-Nasr Dubai	0	(0)
2007–2008	Fujairah Club	0	(0)
2008	Boulogne	4	(0)
2008–2010	El Geish	34	(10)
2010–2011	Haras El-Hodood Club	0	(0)
2011–2012	Fleury-Mérogis		
2012–2013	Linas-Montlhéry		
2013–2014	Vevey		

International career
2001–2006	Togo	11	(1)
- * Club domestic league appearances and goals

Mickaël Dodzi Dogbé (born 28 November 1976) is a former professional footballer who played as a forward. Born in France, he represented Togo at international level.

== International career ==
He was part of the Togolese squad at the 2006 African Nations Cup team, which finished bottom of group B in the first round of competition, thus failing to secure qualification for the quarter-finals of the ANC.
