= ESA Linas-Montlhéry =

French football club

Linas-Montlhéry
- Full name: Entente Sportive et Athlétique de Linas-Montlhéry
- Nicknames: Sang et Or (Blood and Gold)
- Short name: ESALM
- Founded: 1960; 66 years ago
- Ground: Stade Paul Desgouillons
- President: Michael Bertansetti
- Manager: Stéphane Cabrelli
- League: National 3 Group H
- 2022–23: National 3 Group L, 2nd
- Website: linas-montlhery.footeo.com

Entente Sportive et Athlétique de Linas-Montlhéry is a football club based in the towns of Linas and Montlhéry in France. As of the 2024–25 season, it competes in the Championnat National 3, the fifth tier of the French football league system. The club's colors are yellow, and its nickname is Sang et Or, meaning Blood and Gold.

== History ==
Linas-Montlhéry was founded in 1960 as a result of the merging of two clubs, US Linas and ES Montlhéry.

The club gained notable attention after being drawn against French champions Paris Saint-Germain (PSG) in the round of 64 of the 2019–20 Coupe de France. The match took place on 5 January 2020 at the Stade Robert Bobin, and ended in a 6–0 victory for PSG. Unfortunately for Linas-Montlhéry, they had a penalty saved by PSG's goalkeeper Sergio Rico when the score was 1–0. After the end of the 2019–20 season was cancelled due to the COVID-19 pandemic, Linas-Montlhéry sat top of their group in the Régional 1. They were subsequently promoted to the Championnat National 3, the fifth division in the French football pyramid.

On 13 November 2021, Linas-Montlhéry eliminated Ligue 2 side Dunkerque in the seventh round of the 2021–22 Coupe de France. The match ended in a 1–0 victory for ESALM after a late goal from Tom Bouvil. Goalkeeper Ali Lutumba made several "heroic" saves to stop Dunkerque from scoring. On 19 December, Linas-Montlhéry eliminated Ligue 1 club Angers in the round of 64 thanks to two goals from Pascal Leno. In the round of 32, Sang-et-Or were knocked out by Ligue 2 side Amiens; the Somme side took a 3–0 lead, only to concede three Linas-Montlhéry goals to bring the match to a penalty shoot-out. Amiens eventually won the shoot-out by a score of 4–3.

== Stadium ==
The club is a resident of both the Stade Paul Desgouillons and the Stade Cosom, although the Stade Paul Desgouillons is the main venue at which the club play at. The Stade Cosom has a capacity of 1,000.

In 2020, the Stade Paul Desgouillons was renovated, in order for Linas-Montlhéry to not be relegated.

Tanguy Ndombele is an icon of Linas-Montlhéry, and the club has put up a poster of him in the Stade Paul Desgouillons, just like several other notable former youth players.

== Players ==
=== Squad ===
As of 28 November 2021

Note: Flags indicate national team as defined under FIFA eligibility rules; some limited exceptions apply. Players may hold more than one non-FIFA nationality.

No.	Pos.	Nation	Player
—	GK	FRA	Ali Lutumba
—	GK	FRA	David Madureira
—	GK	MLI	Bandiougou Dianka
—	DF	FRA	Gratien Tsota
—	DF	FRA	Teddy Duval
—	DF	FRA	William Djoko
—	DF	SEN	Elhadji Tchabo
—	DF	ITA	Colin Kouassi
—	DF	CIV	Ousmane Diallo
—	DF	FRA	Kylian Baroudi
—	DF	FRA	Yanis Félix
—	MF	FRA	Johan Roca (captain)
—	MF	FRA	Xavier Marcilla
—	MF	FRA	Mehdi Admi

No.	Pos.	Nation	Player
—	MF	COD	Bryan Botuly
—	MF	FRA	Jordan Fukidi
—	MF	FRA	Tom Bouvil
—	MF	CIV	Emmanuel Gbobouo
—	MF	FRA	Albino Bass
—	MF	FRA	Lucas Lamoureux
—	MF	GRE	Basile Karagiannis
—	FW	FRA	Haris El Mouttaqi
—	FW	COD	Aurélien Ngeyitala
—	FW	MLI	Baba Sylla
—	FW	FRA	Pascal Leno
—	FW	COD	Issa Cissé
—	FW	FRA	Aadil El Gachbour
—	FW	BFA	Ohiri Dignan

=== Notable players ===
- (Republic of the Congo) Dylan Bahamboula
- (France) Plaisir Bahamboula
- (France) Claude Bakadal
- (France) Paul Bernardoni
- (Togo) Mickaël Dogbé
- (France) Chris Gadi
- (France) Jules Iloki
- (Mali) Djegui Koita
- (France) Jean-Victor Makengo (youth)
- (France) Tanguy Ndombele
- (Cameroon) Yvan Neyou
- (Democratic Republic of the Congo) Aurélien Ngeyitala
- (France) Randy Nteka
- (Cameroon) Paul-Georges Ntep
- (France) Mickaël Panos
- (France) William Rémy
- (France) Gime Touré
- (Democratic Republic of the Congo) Yoane Wissa

== Honours ==
ESA Linas-Montlhéry honours
Honour	No.	Years
Régional 1 Paris Île-de-France	1	2019–20
