= Djegui Koita =

Malian footballer (born 1999)

Personal information
- Date of birth: 5 August 1999 (age 27)
- Place of birth: Bamako, Mali
- Height: 1.90 m (6 ft 3 in)
- Position: Defender

Youth career
- Linas-Montlhéry

Senior career*
| Years | Team | Apps | (Gls) |
| 2018–2021 | Guingamp B | 31 | (1) |
| 2018–2021 | Guingamp | 2 | (0) |
| 2022–2024 | Jura Sud | 62 | (0) |
| 2024–2025 | Andrézieux | 5 | (0) |
| 2025 | Jura Sud | 14 | (0) |
- * Club domestic league appearances and goals as of 17 May 2025

Djegui Koita (born 5 August 1999) is a Malian professional footballer who plays as a defender.

== Career ==
Having started his career in the youth ranks of Linas-Montlhéry, Koita signed his first professional contract with Guingamp 15 June 2018. He made his professional debut for the club in a 0–0 Ligue 1 tie with Caen on 20 October 2018.

On 7 January 2022, Koita signed for Championnat National 2 side Jura Sud.

== Honours ==
Guingamp

- Coupe de la Ligue runner-up: 2018–19
