= Henri Jacques Guillaume Clarke =

French politician, diplomat and officer (1765–1818)

Marshal of France Henri Jacques Guillaume Clarke Comte d'Hunebourg, Duc de Feltre
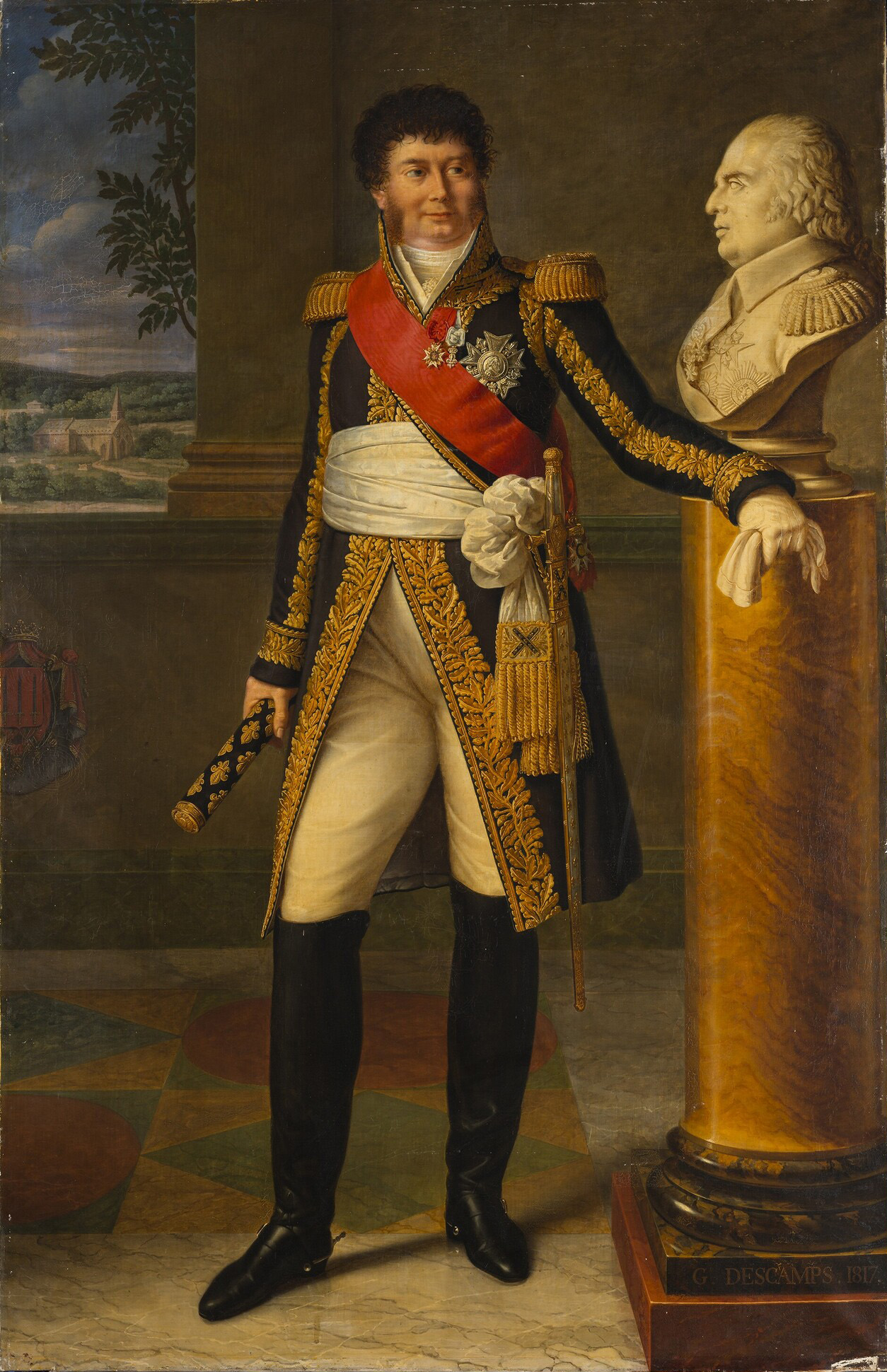
- Portrait by Guillaume Descamps, 1817

Minister of War
- In office 19 August 1807 – 1 April 1814
- Preceded by: Louis-Alexandre Berthier
- Succeeded by: Pierre Dupont de l'Étang
- In office 11 March 1815 – 20 March 1815
- Preceded by: Jean-de-Dieu Soult
- Succeeded by: Louis-Nicolas Davout
- In office 26 September 1815 – 12 September 1817
- Preceded by: Laurent de Gouvion Saint-Cyr
- Succeeded by: Laurent de Gouvion Saint-Cyr

Personal details
- Born: 17 August 1765 Landrecies, Hainaut, France
- Died: 28 August 1818 (aged 53) Neuviller-la-Roche, Bas-Rhin, France

Military service
- Allegiance: Kingdom of France; Kingdom of France; First French Republic; First French Empire; Bourbon Restoration
- Branch/service: Army
- Years of service: 1782–1816
- Rank: Marshal of France
- Battles/wars: French Revolutionary Wars; Napoleonic Wars

Henri-Jacques-Guillaume Clarke, 1st comte d'Hunebourg, 1st duc de Feltre (French: [ɑ̃ʁi ʒak ɡijom klaʁk]; 17 October 1765 – 28 October 1818), was a French military officer, diplomat, and politician of Irish origin who served as Minister of War of the First French Empire from 1807 to 1814. He was made a Marshal of France in 1816.

== Early life and career ==
Clarke was born in Landrecies, northern France, on 18 October 1765, to Irish parents from Lisdowney, County Kilkenny. Clarke was one of the most influential and charismatic Franco-Irish generals in the French army during the Napoleonic period. His family had close links to the Irish Brigade of France. His father served in Dillon's Regiment, and his mother's father and several uncles served in Clare's Regiment.

In September 1781, Clarke entered the Military School of Paris as a cadet, joining the army in November 1782 as a second lieutenant in Berwick's Regiment. He was later transferred to the Colonel General Hussar Regiment with the rank of captain. In 1790, Clarke left active service to work as an attaché at the British Embassy in Paris. He soon returned to the army, serving as a captain in the 16th Dragoon Regiment and later the 14th Dragoon Regiment from 1790 to 1791.

== Military career ==
With the outbreak of the French Revolutionary Wars in 1792, Clarke was posted to the Army of the Rhine, distinguishing himself at the capture of Speyer in September 1792, and was responsible for covering the retreat to Worms in March 1793. In May 1793, he was promoted to brigade general by the representatives on mission with the Army of the Rhine. Appointed Chief of Staff of that army the next month, in October he fell under suspicion and was suspended, arrested and briefly imprisoned. After his release, Clarke lived in Alsace until Lazare Carnot found him a post at the Directory's Topographical Bureau and restored him to his rank. He was made a general of division in December 1795, and during the following years Clarke served in the Army of Italy under Napoleon Bonaparte. He negotiated an alliance with the Kingdom of Sardinia in 1798.

After being admitted to the army reserve, Clarke supported the coup d'état of 18 Brumaire that brought Bonaparte to power. Afterwards, under the Consulate and early Empire, he held the offices of State Councillor and state secretary for the army and navy, as well as ambassador to the Kingdom of Etruria in 1801. During the War of the Third Coalition in 1805, Clarke was appointed governor of Vienna, and during the War of the Fourth Coalition in 1806 he served as governor of Erfurt and of Berlin.

== Minister of War ==
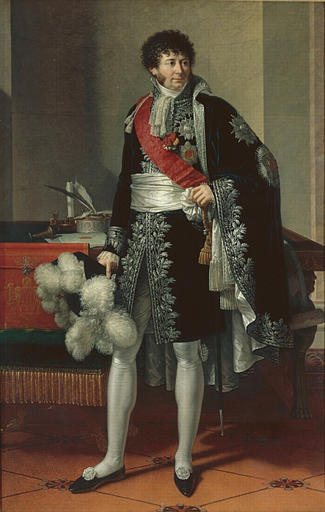
Clarke as Minister of War, by François-Xavier Fabre (1810)

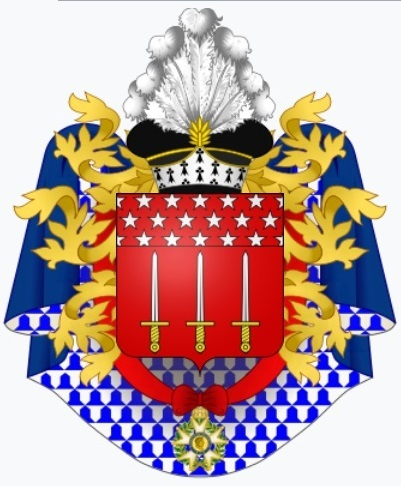
Heraldic achievement of Henri-Jacques-Guillaume Clarke, Duke of Feltre

Louis-Alexandre Berthier's position as both Chief of Staff and Minister of War proved overwhelming, and in 1807 Napoleon relocated the Ministry of War to Paris, naming Clarke to head it. Clarke quickly took control of the Ministry and began developing its authority, first by taking over the responsibilities of the Ministry of War Administration and then by encroaching upon other Ministries' administrative areas. His role in thwarting the British invasion of the Netherlands, the Walcheren Campaign in 1809, lead to the emperor creating him Duc de Feltre ("Duke of Feltre", extinct in 1852 but extended in 1864). Napoleon came to depend on his authority and he was instrumental in organizing the administration and building the Grande Armée in 1811–1812. As chief military organizer, he claimed authority over conscription, the production of all military items, funding, and even health services. This led both to conflict with other Ministers and to an expansion of his own authority.

In 1812, when Claude François de Malet attempted his coup in Paris, Clarke saw an opportunity to expand his authority yet further. Anne Jean Marie René Savary, the Minister of Police and Clarke's main rival by 1812, was arrested by Malet and Clarke moved in to provide military police powers. Napoleon, however, was alarmed by Clarke's assumption of power in his absence and upon his return to Paris in December 1812 reappointed Savary. Although he needed Clarke's centralized Ministry in 1813, he never fully trusted Clarke after the Malet affair, and in November 1813 appointed an equally strong administrator, Pierre Daru, as Minister of War Administration. Daru began building his own authority, and during 1814 the army suffered as both Clarke and Daru sparred over administrative responsibilities and authority. As the Allies approached Paris, Clarke found himself with the responsibility to defend the capital but with split authority; not only was he charged with producing manpower for Napoleon, a duty he shared with Daru, but he was also responsible for the population and civil defense. He found himself organizing hospitals and mobilizing the population. In the end, his efforts at defense were ineffectual and he was one of the generals pressing for Napoleon's abdication.

== Bourbon Restoration ==
After Napoleon's abdication, Clarke was replaced as Minister of War by Dupont de l'Étang but King Louis XVIII made him a Peer of France. When Napoleon landed in Southern France in March 1815 to reclaim his throne (the "Hundred Days"), Clarke was again made Minister of War and served until the Bourbon government fled. When the King fled to Ghent, Clarke followed him. After Napoleon's second abdication, Clarke was made Minister of War once more and served in that capacity until 1817 when Gouvion Saint-Cyr took over. He was then given command of the 15th Military Division.

Clarke was made a Marshal of France on 3 July 1816. He died in Neuviller-la-Roche on 28 October 1818.

Political offices
Preceded by Louis Alexandre Berthier	Minister of War; 19 August 1807 – 1 April 1814	Succeeded by Dupont de l'Étang
Preceded by Nicolas Jean de Dieu Soult	Minister of War; 11 March 1815 – 20 March 1815	Succeeded by Louis Nicolas Davout
Preceded by Gouvion Saint-Cyr	Minister of War; 26 September 1815 – 12 September 1817	Succeeded by Gouvion Saint-Cyr
