= Fathi Chebel =

Algerian footballer (born 1956)

Fathi Chebal
Personal information
- Date of birth: 19 August 1956 (age 70)
- Place of birth: Lyon, France
- Height: 1.70 m (5 ft 7 in)
- Position: Defender

Senior career*
| Years | Team | Apps | (Gls) |
| 1974–1975 | Villefranche | | |
| 1975–1979 | Nancy | 42 | (1) |
| 1979–1980 | Metz | 37 | (1) |
| 1980–1981 | Riyadh | | |
| 1981–1982 | Besançon | | |
| 1982–1985 | RC Paris | | |
| 1985–1986 | AS Béziers | | |
| 1986–1987 | Bourges | | |
| 1987–1988 | Martigues | | |
| 1988–1989 | Créteil | | |
| 1989–1990 | Lens | 8 | (0) |
| 1990–1991 | Créteil | | |

International career
| 1981–1982 | Algeria | 2 | (0) |

Managerial career
- 1989: Créteil
- * Club domestic league appearances and goals

Fathi Chebel (born 19 August 1956) is a former footballer who played as a defender, spending his career in France. Born in France, he played for the Algeria national team internationally, most notably at the 1986 FIFA World Cup. After retiring as a player, he became a manager.
