= Rafaël Dias =

Portuguese footballer (born 1991)

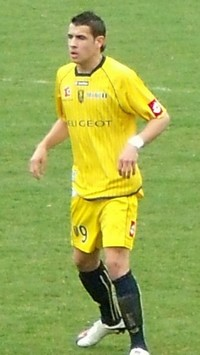

Personal information
- Full name: Rafaël Marques Dias Brito
- Date of birth: 29 January 1991 (age 35)
- Place of birth: Covilhã, Portugal
- Height: 1.80 m (5 ft 11 in)
- Position: Midfielder

Team information
- Current team: Racing Besançon
- Number: 10

Youth career
- 1996–2003: FC 4 Rivières 70
- 2003–2010: Sochaux

Senior career*
Years	Team	Apps	(Gls)
2010–2014	Sochaux	29	(1)
2014	→ Arles-Avignon (loan)	13	(2)
2014–2016	US Créteil	30	(2)
2016–2017	Racing Besançon	13	(3)
2017–2018	US Créteil	26	(2)
2018–2021	Besançon	38	(24)
2021–	Racing Besançon	99	(28)

International career
2005–2006	France U15	4	(2)
2007	France U16	2	(0)
2010–2011	Portugal U20	1	(0)
- * Club domestic league appearances and goals as of 7 February 2026

Rafaël Marques Dias Brito (born 29 January 1991), commonly known as Rafaël Dias, is a Portuguese footballer who plays for French club Racing Besançon.

Brito was born in Covilhã, Portugal, but acquired French nationality and was a France youth international having earned caps with the under-15 and under-16 teams. Dias recently switched allegiances to his birth country Portugal after joining up with the nation's under-20 team in 2010.

Dias plays as an attacking midfielder and is the son of former S.C. Covilhã player Quim Brito, as well as the nephew of former Portuguese international César Brito. He made his professional debut on 7 April 2010 in a league match against Marseille. On 2 September 2010, Dias signed his first professional contract agreeing to a three-year deal with Sochaux until June 2013.

== Club career ==
=== Early career ===
Dias was born on 7 January 1991 in Covilhã, Portugal. At the age of six months, his family moved to France after his father, Quim Brito, a football player, signed with FC 4 Rivières 70, an amateur club located in Dampierre-sur-Salon in the Franche-Comté region. His uncle César Brito was also a footballer and played internationally for Portugal. Dias began his football career playing for 4 Rivières at the age of five in 1996. He spent seven years at the club and, in 2003, signed youth papers with professional club Sochaux.

=== Sochaux ===
Upon his arrival to the club, Dias was inserted into the club's youth academy. He quickly rose through the ranks of the academy and established himself as one of the club's top prospects in his age group alongside fellow midfielder Serdar Gürler, striker Cédric Bakambu, and goalkeeper Pierrick Cros. In the 2008–09 season, Dias began appearing with the club's reserve team in the Championnat de France amateur. He made his amateur debut on 29 November 2008 in a league match against Colmar appearing as a substitute. Dias finished the campaign with eight appearances; seven of them as a substitute.

During the 2009–10 season, Dias continued to developed with the club's reserve team in the fourth division. He appeared in 15 matches scoring six goals. Also during the season, Dias was a part of the Sochaux under-19 team that reached the final of the Coupe Gambardella, the country's prestigious youth cup competition. In the lead up to the final, he scored doubles against Toulouse and Nantes in the quarter-finals and semi-finals, respectively. In the final match against Metz at the Stade de France, Sochaux were defeated 4–3 on penalties. Dias converted his penalty, however, early failed attempts by Gürler and Clément Giraud dashed the team's hopes. It was later reported by the media that scouts of English club Tottenham Hotspur attended the game to watch Dias.

Midway through the 2009–10 Ligue 1 season, Dias, alongside Gürler, began integrating with the first team after manager Francis Gillot announced his desire to give the club's youth talent an opportunity. On 7 April 2010, he made his professional debut in a league match against Marseille. Dias appeared as a substitute in the match and played 16 minutes in a 3–0 defeat. Two weeks later, he made another league appearance, again as a substitute in another 3–0 defeat, this time against Boulogne.

Following the season, Dias spent the summer training with Portuguese Liga club Benfica. Benfica wanted the player to remain at the club, however, due to being under contract with Sochaux, he returned to France for pre-season training. On 2 September 2010, Dias signed his first professional contract agreeing to a three-year deal with Sochaux until June 2013. He was officially promoted to the senior team and assigned the number 28 shirt. Dias, however, still remains a fixture on the club's reserve team in the CFA having scored four goals in 10 appearances. His first professional appearance of the season came on 16 October in a 2–0 defeat to Montpellier.

With his contract due to expire, Dias signed a new three-year contract with Sochaux on 30 June 2013.

In January 2014, Dias was loaned out in Ligue 2 to AC Arles-Avignon, to gain more playing time.

=== Later career ===
On 1 September 2014, Dias signed for Ligue 2 club US Créteil on a two-year contract.

In October 2016, he signed for amateur club Racing Besançon.

In June 2017, Dias rejoined US Créteil, who now played in the Championnat National.

Dias signed for Besançon in October 2018.

He transferred back to city rivals Racing Besançon in summer 2021. He was made club captain for the 2022–23 season.

== International career ==
Though Dias was born in Portugal, due to living in France since he was six months old, he acquired citizenship, thus making him eligible to represent both Portugal and France at international level. At the age of 14, Dias represented France at under-15 level. The following year, he was called up to the under-16 team by coach Francis Smerecki. Dias appeared in two friendly matches against Poland in March 2007. Between 2007 and 2010, Dias was not selected by Smerecki for international duty.

In 2010, Dias announced his intent to represent Portugal at international level and confirmed his decision by declining the opportunity to attend a training camp for future France national under-21 players. He was later selected by the Portugal under-20 team. On 7 October 2010, Dias made his debut with the under-20 team in a friendly match against France. The following month, he was called up to the team against to participate in training sessions with the team preparing for the 2011 FIFA U-20 World Cup.
