= Guillaume Descamps =

French painter and engraver (1779–1858)

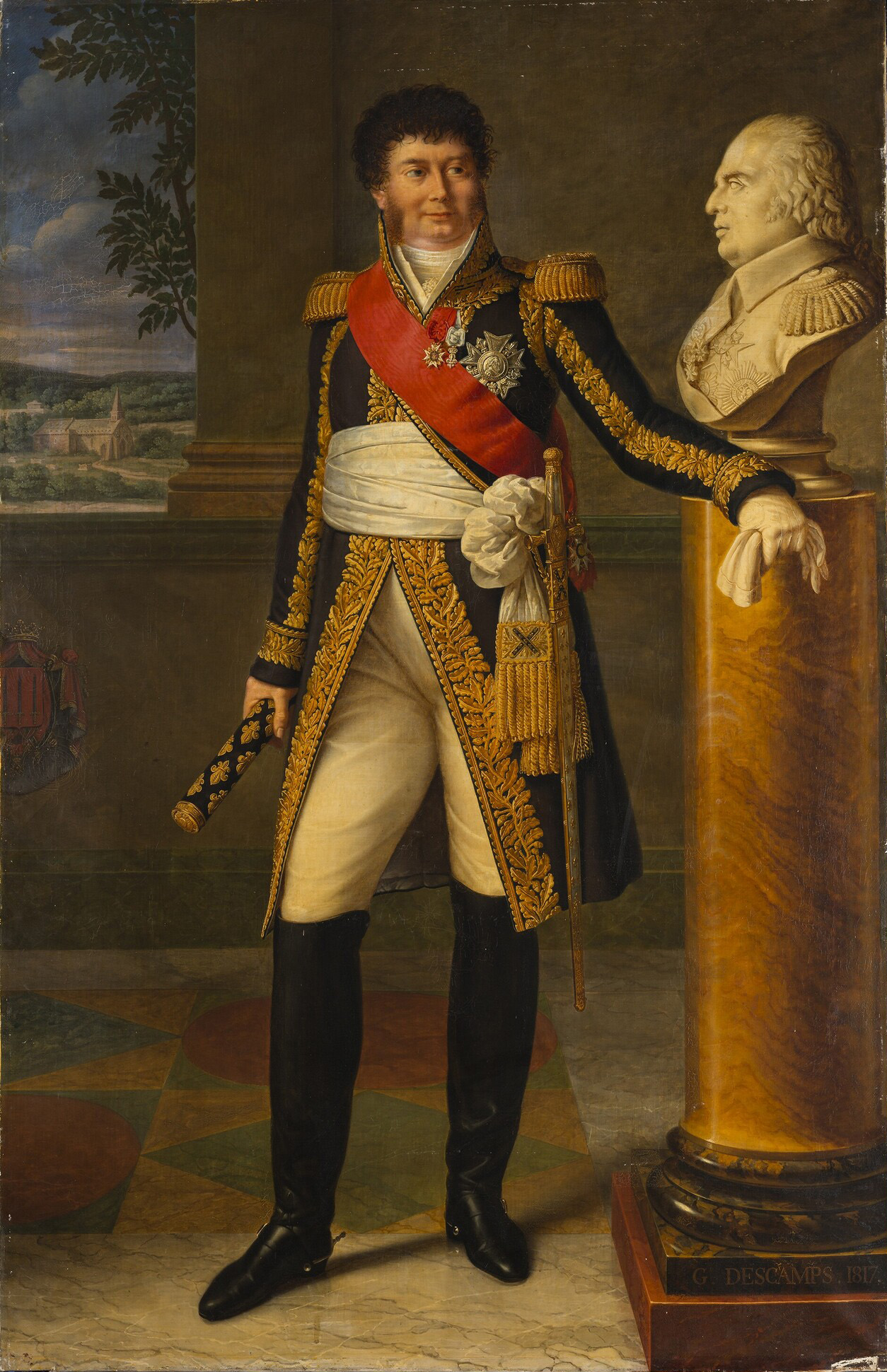
Henri Jacques Guillaume Clarke, 1817

Guillaume-Désiré-Joseph Descamps (1779–1858), a French painter and engraver, was born at Lille. He was a pupil of François-André Vincent, but, obtaining the "prix de Rome," he improved himself by travelling in Italy, and became court-painter of Murat in Naples. He died in Paris in 1858. The following paintings were executed by him:

- The Women of Sparta (in the Lille Museum). 1808.
- The Martyrdom of St. Andrew (in St. Andrė, Lille).
- Murat on board the Ceres distributing Rewards (engraved hy himself).
- The Conversion of St. Augustine (in St. Eustache, Paris).
- The Apotheosis of Cardinal Tommasi (in San Martino di Monti, Rome).
- The Neapolitan Troops marching out against Capri.

As an engraver he also produced six plates from the 'Fable of Psyche.'

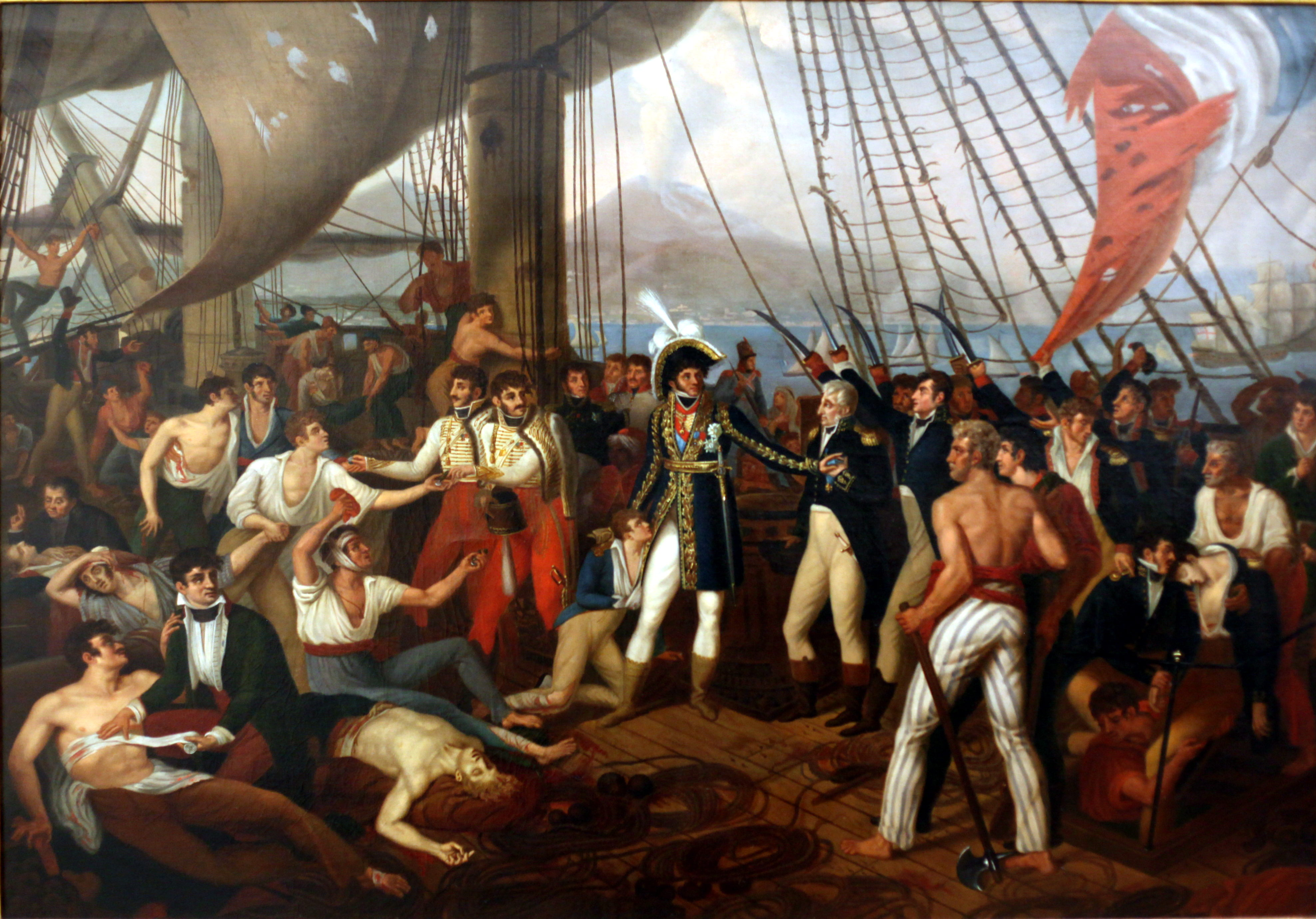
Murat on board the Cérès distributing Rewards
