= Walid Aïchour =

French footballer (born 1977)

Personal information
- Date of birth: 17 November 1977 (age 48)
- Place of birth: Tremblay-en-France, France
- Height: 1.71 m (5 ft 7 in)
- Position: Midfielder

Senior career*
Years	Team	Apps	(Gls)
1997–1998	Auxerre II		
1998–2001	Red Star		
2001–2002	Olympique Noisy-le-Sec		
2002–2003	Istres	35	(1)
2004	Cannes		
2004–2005	Rouen		
2005–2007	Blois Foot 41		
2007–2014	ES Viry-Châtillon		

Managerial career
- 2014–2017: ES Viry-Châtillon
- 2020–2023: AS Poissy
- 2024: Bourges Foot 18
- 2025: FC Bobigny-Bagnolet-Gagny
- * Club domestic league appearances and goals

Walid Aïchour (born 17 November 1977) is a French football manager and former player who most recently managed FC Bobigny-Bagnolet-Gagny. A midfielder, he played on the professional level in Ligue 2 for Istres.
