= Quentin Pereira =

French footballer (born 1992)

Personal information
- Full name: Quentin Leite Pereira
- Date of birth: 21 April 1992 (age 34)
- Place of birth: Reims, France
- Height: 1.74 m (5 ft 9 in)
- Position: Midfielder

Youth career
- Sochaux

Senior career*
Years	Team	Apps	(Gls)
2010–2012	Sochaux II	31	(2)
2012–2014	Stade de Reims	6	(0)
2013–2014	→ Stade de Reims II (loan)	17	(3)
2015–2016	RC Épernay Champagne	6	(1)
2016–2017	Port Vale	14	(0)
2019	Sant Julià	0	(0)
2019–2021	Differdange	31	(4)
2021–2022	CA Vitry	4	(0)
- * Club domestic league appearances and goals as of 10 August 2023

Quentin Leite Pereira (born 21 April 1992) is a French footballer who plays as a midfielder.

A former Sochaux youth team player, he played in the 2010 final of the Coupe Gambardella. He was signed to Stade de Reims in January 2012, and played six Ligue 2 games for the club as they won promotion out of Ligue 2 in 2011–12. He joined RC Épernay Champagne in the Championnat de France Amateur 2 for the 2015–16 season. He joined English club Port Vale in July 2016, though left the club in May 2017. Following a two-season break from the game he joined Andorran side UE Sant Julià for the start of the 2019–20 season, before quickly moving on to Differdange of Luxembourg. He joined CA Vitry in 2022.

== Career ==
=== Early career ===
Pereira came through the Sochaux youth team and was a 65-minute substitute for Petrus Boumal in the 2010 final of the Coupe Gambardella at the Stade de France, where Sochaux lost to Metz on penalties following a 1–1 draw. He scored two goals in 22 appearances for the reserve team in the Championnat de France amateur (fourth tier) in the 2010–11 season, helping them to qualify for the play-offs, where they were beaten by Olympique Lyonnais II. He then featured nine times in the 2011–12 season, as the team finished in 13th place.

He was signed by Stade de Reims in January 2012. He made his professional debut on 19 March, coming on for Kamel Ghilas 77 minutes into a 1–0 win over Le Mans at the MMArena. He started one game for the club, a 3–2 win over Boulogne at the Stade Auguste-Delaune on 1 May. Stade de Reims were promoted out of Ligue 2 as runners-up in 2011–12 under head coach Hubert Fournier, and Pereira never made it onto the pitch in Ligue 1. He requested a loan move, but the club turned down his request. He scored three goals in 17 Championnat de France Amateur 2 (CFA 2 - fifth tier) games for the Reserve team in the 2013–14 season. His contract was terminated in July 2014. He spent the second half of the 2015–16 season in CFA 2 with RC Épernay Champagne, and scored one goal in six matches as the club were relegated into the Regional Leagues (sixth tier).

=== Port Vale ===
Pereira signed a two-year contract with EFL League One club Port Vale in July 2016. He remained on the fringes of the first-team at the start of the 2016–17 season, but put in a strong substitute appearance in a 2–2 draw with Peterborough United on 10 September that coach Andy Smith said would "will pickle manager Bruno Ribeiro's] head on elections". However, he had only one league start to his name before he scored a hat-trick in a reserve team match with Morecambe in October, after which reserve team coach Michael Brown said Pereira was close to breaking into the first team. However, speaking as caretaker manager four months later, Brown said that "Pereira hasn't trained great for a long time now, he has not been near it". He left Port Vale following the club's relegation in May 2017 after he and Brown came to a mutual agreement to end his contract.

=== Later career ===
In June 2019, Pereira signed with Andorran Primera Divisió side UE Sant Julià. He played both legs in their UEFA Europa League qualification preliminary round defeat to Gibraltan side Europa FC. Pereira left the club soon afterwards and instead joined FC Differdange 03 in Luxembourg's National Division. He joined CA Vitry in 2022.

== Style of play ==
Speaking in July 2016, Pereira described himself as a midfielder who plays "a simple, technical game".

== Career statistics ==
Appearances and goals by club, season and competition
Club	Season	League			National cup (Note: Includes Coupe de France, FA Cup, Copa Constitució, Luxembourg Cup)		League cup (Note: Includes Coupe de la Ligue, EFL Cup)		Other		Total	
Club	Season	Division	Apps	Goals	Apps	Goals	Apps	Goals	Apps	Goals	Apps	Goals
Sochaux II	2010–11	CFA Group B	22	2	0	0	0	0	0	0	22	2
Sochaux II	2011–12	CFA Group B	9	0	0	0	0	0	0	0	9	0
Sochaux II	Total		31	2	0	0	0	0	0	0	31	2
Stade de Reims	2011–12	Ligue 2	6	0	0	0	0	0	0	0	6	0
Stade de Reims	2012–13	Ligue 1	0	0	0	0	0	0	0	0	0	0
Stade de Reims	Total		6	0	0	0	0	0	0	0	6	0
Stade de Reims II (loan)	2013–14	CFA 2	17	3	0	0	0	0	0	0	17	3
RC Épernay Champagne	2015–16	CFA 2	6	1	0	0	0	0	0	0	6	1
Port Vale	2016–17	EFL League One	14	0	0	0	0	0	3 (Note: Appearance(s) in the EFL Trophy.)	0	17	0
UE Sant Julià	2019–20	Primera Divisió	0	0	0	0	—		2 (Note: Appearance(s) in the UEFA Europa League.)	0	0	0
Differdange	2019–20	Luxembourg National Division	13	3	0	0	—		0	0	13	3
CA Vitry	2022–23	Championnat National 3	4	0	0	0	0	0	0	0	4	0
Career total			91	9	0	0	0	0	5	0	96	9

== Honours ==
Sochaux II

- Coupe Gambardella runner-up: 2010
