= Geoffrey Tulasne =

French footballer (born 1988)

Personal information
- Date of birth: 24 February 1988 (age 38)
- Place of birth: Péronne, France
- Height: 1.76 m (5 ft 9 in)
- Position: Midfielder

Youth career
- 2005–2007: Sochaux

Senior career*
| Years | Team | Apps | (Gls) |
| 2007–2009 | Sochaux B | 19 | (4) |
| 2008–2011 | Sochaux | 32 | (1) |
| 2012–2014 | Red Star | 37 | (0) |
| Total | | 88 | (5) |

International career
| 2008–2009 | France U21 | 2 | (0) |
- * Club domestic league appearances and goals

Geoffrey Tulasne (born 24 February 1988) is a French former professional footballer who played as a midfielder for FC Sochaux-Montbéliard and Red Star.

== Club career ==
Tulasne was born in Péronne, France. A Sochaux youth product, he spent three years with the first team in which he made just 32 appearances. He left the club in 2011 after deciding not to renew his contract.

In November 2011, he trialled with Ligue 2 side Stade Lavallois.

In December 2012, free agent Tulasne signed a 1.5-year contract Paris-based club Red Star. In June 2014 he agreed to end his contract with the club.

== International career ==
Tulasne made two appearances for the France U21 national team in 2008 and 2009.

== Honours ==
- Coupe Gambardella: 2007
