= Yven Moyo =

Association football player (born 1992)

Personal information
- Full name: Yven Rochild Victor Moyo
- Date of birth: 15 March 1992 (age 34)
- Place of birth: Orléans, France
- Height: 1.78 m (5 ft 10 in)
- Position: Left midfielder

Youth career
- 1999–2005: US Grigny
- 2005–2008: Sochaux

Senior career*
Years	Team	Apps	(Gls)
2008–2010	Sochaux B	13	(0)
2010–2013	Newcastle United	0	(0)
2013–2014	Amiens B	12	(2)
2014–2015	KF Laçi		
2015–2016	Concarneau	30	(7)
2016–2017	Laval B	11	(3)
2016–2017	Laval	7	(0)
2018	Palanga	10	(0)
2018–2019	Saint-Malo	14	(3)
2020–2021	Saint-Geneviève	1	(0)
2021–2022	Amilly	19	(3)
2022	RE Durbuy		

International career
2009–2010	France U18	4	(0)
2011	Congo	1	(0)
- * Club domestic league appearances and goals

Yven Rochild Victor Moyo (born 15 March 1992) is a professional footballer who plays as a left midfielder. A dual French-Congolese national, he is a former Republic of the Congo international.

== Club career ==
Born in Orléans, France, Moyo began his career at Sochaux. He signed a four-year contract with Newcastle United on 29 September 2010.

In 2017, Moyo left Laval. In January 2022, he joined Belgian club RE Durbuy.

== International career ==
Moyo made his international debut for Congo on 11 November 2011, in a 5–0 victory over São Tomé and Príncipe in a 2014 FIFA World Cup qualifier.
