= Jean-Mathieu Descamps =

French footballer (born 1983)

Personal information
- Full name: Jean-Mathieu Descamps
- Date of birth: 12 February 1983 (age 43)
- Place of birth: Montpellier, France
- Height: 1.83 m (6 ft 0 in)
- Position: Striker

Youth career
- 1995–2002: Montpellier

Senior career*
Years	Team	Apps	(Gls)
2002–2004	Montpellier	13	(0)
2004–2005	Málaga	7	(0)
2005–2006	Libourne-Saint-Seurin	36	(6)
2006–2007	Racing de Ferrol	15	(3)
2007–2008	Sète	13	(1)
2008–2009	Libourne-Saint-Seurin	29	(7)
2009–2010	Jura Sud	17	(10)
2010–2012	Martigues	64	(22)
2010–2014	Grenoble	39	(15)
Total		233	(64)
- * Club domestic league appearances and goals

Jean-Mathieu Descamps (born 12 February 1983) is a French former footballer who played as a striker. He played at the professional level with hometown club Montpellier. He also had two stints in Spain with Málaga in the 2004–05 La Liga season and with Racing de Ferrol in the Tercera División in 2006.
