= Yohan Croizet =

French footballer (born 1992)

Yohan Croizet-Kollár
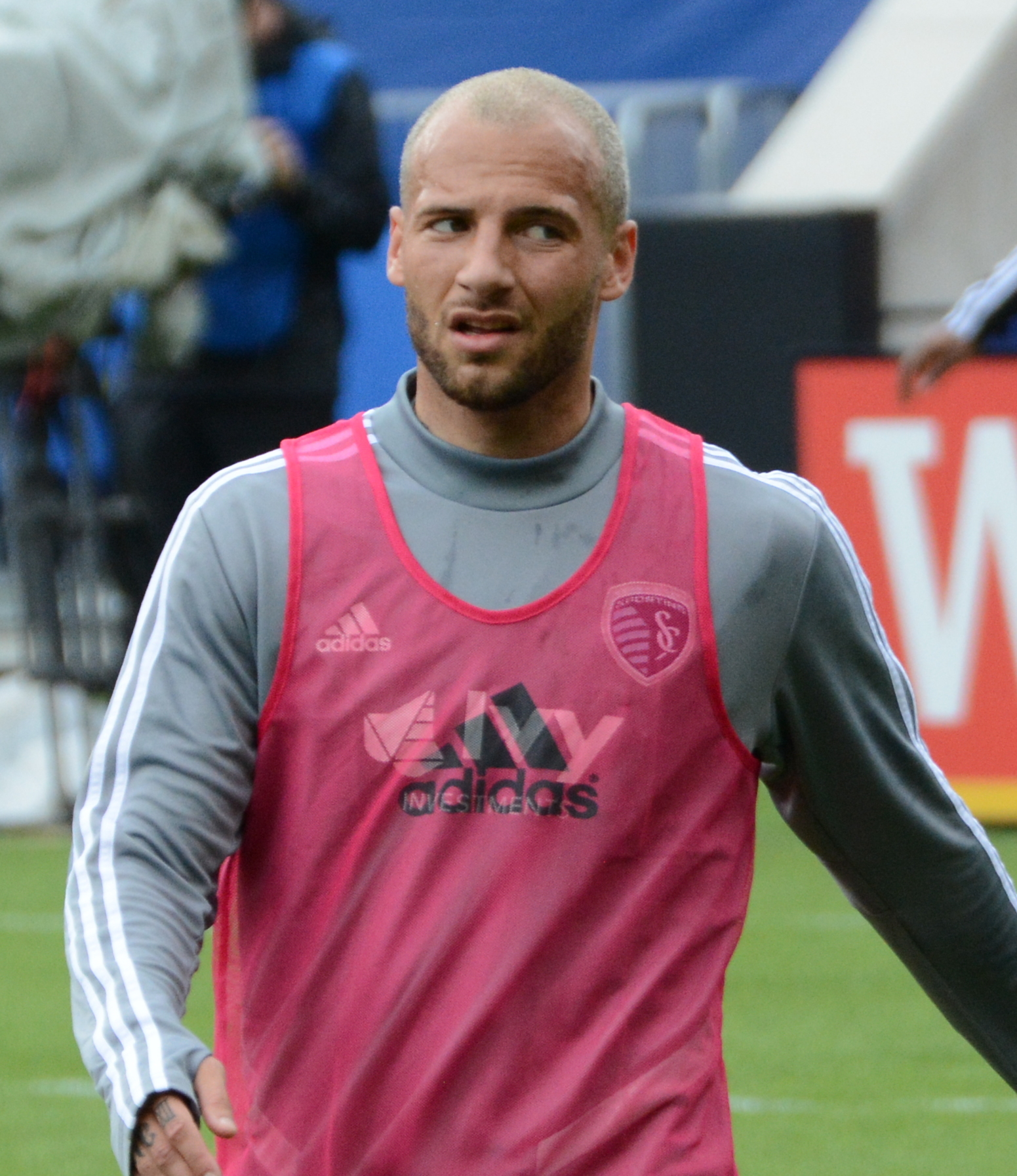
- Croizet with Sporting Kansas City in 2019

Personal information
- Date of birth: 15 February 1992 (age 34)
- Place of birth: Sarrebourg, France
- Height: 1.78 m (5 ft 10 in)
- Position: Attacking midfielder

Team information
- Current team: Diósgyőr
- Number: 15

Youth career
- 1997–2004: FC Sarrebourg
- 2004–2011: Metz

Senior career*
Years	Team	Apps	(Gls)
2011–2013	Metz	2	(0)
2011–2013	Metz II	57	(7)
2013–2014	Virton	31	(6)
2014–2016	OH Leuven	59	(13)
2016–2017	KV Mechelen	52	(3)
2018–2019	Sporting Kansas City	56	(6)
2020–2021	OH Leuven	7	(0)
2021–2024	Újpest	40	(7)
2021–2024	Újpest II	8	(5)
2023–2024	→ Zalaegerszeg (loan)	27	(8)
2024–2025	Zalaegerszeg	33	(8)
2025–	Diósgyőr	11	(1)
- * Club domestic league appearances and goals as of 30 May 2026

Yohan Croizet-Kollár (French: [jɔ.an kʁwa.zɛ]; born 15 February 1992) is a French professional footballer who plays as an attacking midfielder for Diósgyőr in the Hungarian Nemzeti Bajnokság I.

== Career ==
Croizet made his senior debut for Ligue 2 side Metz in the 1–0 away win at Guingamp on 12 August 2011, playing 82 minutes before being substituted for fellow debutant Teddy Kayombo. Croizet subsequently returned to the reserve team, and made 10 appearances in the Championnat de France amateur during the first five months of the 2011–12 campaign. He scored seven goals in 57 matches for Metz from 2011 to 2013, when he moved to Belgian second division club RE Virton. He moved to first-division club OH Leuven in 2014, then joined Mechelen in 2016.

On 15 December 2017, Croizet signed as a designated player with American MLS side Sporting Kansas City. He scored his first goal for the club in a 6–0 thrashing of Vancouver Whitecaps FC on 20 April 2018 before netting a dramatic late winner with a stunning volley to win a Lamar Hunt U.S. Open Cup Round of 16 match against FC Dallas 3–2 on 16 June 2018. Croizet netted his first MLS game-winner for the club in a 2–0 win over Minnesota United FC at Children's Mercy Park on 25 August 2018.

Sporting KC and Croizet mutually agreed to part ways on 23 September 2019.

In July 2024, following a loan spell the previous season, Croizet joined Nemzeti Bajnokság I club Zalaegerszeg on a permanent initial one-year deal with the option for a further season.

== Career statistics ==
As of 31 August 2018

Appearances and goals by club, season and competition
Club	Season	League			National cup		League cup		Other		Total	
Club	Season	Division	Apps	Goals	Apps	Goals	Apps	Goals	Apps	Goals	Apps	Goals
Metz	2011–12	Ligue 2	1	0	0	0	0	0	—		1	0
Metz	2012–13	National	1	0	0	0	1	0	—		2	0
Metz	Total		2	0	0	0	1	0	0	0	3	0
Metz II	2011–12	CFA	27	0	—		—		—		27	0
Metz II	2012–13	CFA	30	7	—		—		—		30	7
Metz II	Total		57	7	—		—		—		57	7
Virton	2013–14	Belgian Second Division	31	6	0	0	—		—		31	6
OH Leuven	2014–15	Belgian Second Division	31	4	2	0	—		6 (Note: Appearances in the Second Division play-offs)	0	39	4
OH Leuven	2015–16	Pro League	28	9	2	0	—		—		30	9
OH Leuven	Total		59	13	4	0	—		6	0	69	13
KV Mechelen	2016–17	First Division A	28	3	2	2	—		9 (Note: Appearances in the Europa League play-offs)	0	39	5
KV Mechelen	2017–18	First Division A	15	0	0	0	—		—		15	0
KV Mechelen	Total		43	3	2	2	—		9	0	54	5
Sporting Kansas City	2018	Major League Soccer	24	2	2	2	—		0	0	26	4
Career total			216	31	8	4	1	0	15	0	240	35
