= Teddy Kayombo =

French footballer (born 1991)

Personal information
- Full name: Theodore Kenzo Kayombo
- Date of birth: 25 January 1991 (age 35)
- Place of birth: Lyon, France
- Height: 1.86 m (6 ft 1 in)
- Position: Centre-back

Senior career*
Years	Team	Apps	(Gls)
2009–2012	Metz B	53	(3)
2011–2012	Metz	1	(0)
2012–2013	Tours	1	(0)
2014	Lyon-Duchère	4	(0)
2014–2017	Saint-Priest	24	(0)
2017–2019	FC Bourgoin-Jallieu	43	(3)
2019–2022	Limonest	23	(1)
Total		149	(7)
- * Club domestic league appearances and goals

Theodore Kenzo 'Teddy' Kayombo (born 25 January 1991) is a French former professional footballer who played as a centre-back. (Note: Teddy Kayombo – French league stats at LFP – also available in French (archived))

== Career ==
Kayombo was born in Lyon. He made his debut for the Metz reserve team in the 3–1 away win over Jarville on 24 January 2010, and established himself as a second-string regular during the 2010–11 season. Kayombo played his first senior match for Metz in the 1–0 victory against Guingamp on 12 August 2011, coming on as an 82nd-minute substitute for Yohan Croizet, who was also making his debut in the match. The defender left after three years with the reserve side of Metz, the club and signed in summer of as of 2012 with Tours FC. He played only two games as substitute and was after the end of the season 2012–13 released by Toure. In January 2014, after a half year without a club, he signed for CFA side AS Lyon-Duchère.
