= 2018–19 Coupe de France preliminary rounds, Paris-Île-de-France =

The 2018–19 Coupe de France preliminary rounds, Paris-Île-de-France was the qualifying competition to decide which teams from the leagues of the Paris-Île-de-France region of France took part in the main competition from the seventh round.

== First round ==
These matches were played on 22 and 29 April and 1 and 20 May 2018. Tiers shown reflect the 2017–18 season.

First round results: Paris-Île-de-France
Tie no	Home team (tier)	Score	Away team (tier)
1.	AS Lieusaint (11)	1–1 (1–4 p)	St Thibault-des-Vignes FC (10)
2.	Magny-le-Hongre FC (11)	1–1 (5–3 p)	USC Lesigny (10)
3.	FC Chevry Cosigny 77 (12)	2–6	ASM Ferté-sous-Jouarre (11)
4.	Coulommiers Brie (10)	0–5	CA Combs-la-Ville (10)
5.	Grigny FC (13)	9–1	Entente Longueville Ste Colombe St Loup-de-Naud Soisy-Bouy (10)
6.	CS Mennecy (11)	3–0 (Note: Tie switched at request of both clubs.)	FC Varennes-sur-Seine (13)
7.	Amicale Bocage (13)	2–6	FC Milly-la-Forêt (12)
8.	FC Lissois (12)	3–1	ES Forêt (12)
9.	US Chaumes-Gignes (11)	2–2 (1–3 p)	Portugais Pontault-Combault (10)
10.	ES Jouy-Yvron (13)	2–0	AS Fontenay-Trésigny (11)
11.	AS Saintry (14)	0–1	FC Intercommunal Loing (11)
12.	FC Moret-Veneux Sablons (13)	0–5 (Note: Tie won by forfeit.)	ES Villabé (11)
13.	SO Rozay-en-Brie (13)	0–5	Vaux-le-Pénil La Rochette FC (10)
14.	Héricy-Vulaines-Samoreau FC (12)	1–2	FC St Germain-Saintry-St Pierre (11)
15.	US Boissise-Pringy-Orgenoy (13)	2–4	FC Boussy-Quincy (11)
16.	USD Ferrières-en-Brie (11)	0–4	SC Briard (10)
17.	FC Coudraysien (14)	0–3	Gatinais Val de Loing FC (11)
18.	Marcoussis Nozay La-Ville-du-Bois FC (11)	1–2	Entente Bagneaux Nemours Saint-Pierre (10)
19.	US Ponthierry (10)	1–0	AS Itteville (14)
20.	RCP Fontainebleau (10)	2–3	Aigle Fertoise Boissy le Cutté (12)
21.	ES Saint-Germain-Laval (12)	0–1	AS Soisy-sur-Seine (10)
22.	USM Verneuil (12)	void (Note: USM Verneuil not eligible to compete due to starting an entente (partial merger) with CS Ozouer-le-Voulgis. Replaced in the competition by FC Champenois-Mammesien-Vernoucellois. See tie 192.)	SC Gretz-Tournan (10)
23.	FC Nandy (10)	5–2	US Vert-le-Grand (13)
24.	ES Nangis (13)	5–0	FC Brie Est (10)
25.	SO Vertois (14)	1–2	Savigny-le-Temple FC (11)
26.	ASC Réunionnais de Sénart (13)	6–2	FC Épinay Athlético (12)
27.	Bondoufle Amical Club (13)	5–0	AS Misy Villeneuve-la-Guyard (13)
28.	RC Presles-en-Brie (13)	0–4	Bussy St Georges FC (11)
29.	Villepinte Flamboyants (10)	3–1	US Quincy-Voisins FC (10)
30.	Avenir Survilliers (12)	0–5 (Note: Avenir Survilliers forfeited their place in the championship, and are therefore not eligible to compete. UF Portugais Meaux win the tie by default.)	UF Portugais Meaux (13)
31.	CS Villeroy (13)	0–4	AS Éclair de Puiseux (12)
32.	FC Puiseux-Louvres (13)	0–2	CO Othis (12)
33.	US Centre Brie (13)	4–3	AS Outre-Mer du Bois l'Abbé (12)
34.	AJ Limeil-Brévannes (11)	1–1 (4–5 p)	ES Montgeron (10)
35.	FS Esbly (13)	5–5 (3–5 p)	FC Coubronnais (12)
36.	AS Nanteuil-lès-Meaux (13)	– (Note: Match was stopped. Both teams removed from the competition. Reason as yet unknown.)	AJ du Pavé Neuf Noisy-le-Grand (12)
37.	AC Villenoy (12)	1–5	UF Clichois (10)
38.	FC Cosmo 77 (12)	1–0	ES Villiers-sur-Marne (12)
39.	FC Gournay (12)	7–2	Brie FC (12)
40.	US Lagny Messagers (11)	1–2	FC Nogent-sur-Marne (11)
41.	JS Bondy (13)	3–1	ES Brie Nord (11)
42.	Meaux ADOM (10)	0–2	AS Bondy (10)
43.	ESM Thillay-Vaudherland (13)	5–0 (Note: ES Moussy-le-Neuf forfeited their place in the championship, and are therefore not eligible to compete. ESM Thillay-Vaudherland win the tie by default.)	ES Moussy-le-Neuf (12)
44.	Portugais Académica Champigny (14)	3–4	FC La Plaine de France (12)
45.	Champs FC (13)	0–4	ASF Le Perreux (10)
46.	FC Villepinte (11)	3–2	FCM Garges-lès-Gonesse (10)
47.	ES St Pathus Oissery (12)	1–5	AS Arnouville (12)
48.	Fontenay-en-Parisis FC (12)	5–0	CS Dammartin (11)
49.	JS Villiers-le-Bel (12)	1–2	Goellycompans FC (12)
50.	UMS Pontault-Combault (11)	2–0	FC Cheminots Villeneuve-St Georges (11)
51.	SC Dugny (12)	1–4	Mitry-Mory (10)
52.	FC Esperanto (13)	3–1	FC Émerainville (11)
53.	UF Créteil (11)	3–1	AS Champs-sur-Marne (10)
54.	Courtry Foot (12)	0–3	US Ormesson-sur-Marne (11)
55.	FA Le Raincy (11)	1–2	AS Le Pin-Villevaude (11)
56.	AS Collégien (12)	1–1 (4–2 p)	FC Boissy (11)
57.	AS Chelles (11)	4–1	AS Val de Fontenay (10)
58.	SS Noiseau (14)	5–0	Noisiel FC (11)
59.	CS Mouroux (13)	2–4	Sevran FC (10)
60.	AS La Plaine Victoire (14)	2–0	CA Lizéen (13)
61.	ASS Noiséenne (13)	3–0	US Changis-St Jean-Ussy (13)
62.	Thorigny FC (13)	1–2	FC Romainville (11)
63.	ES Montreuil (12)	4–2	USF Trilport (11)
64.	FC Vaujours (13)	0–3	Pays Créçois FC (11)
65.	AS Paris (12)	5–1	ES Jeunes Stade (13)
66.	FC St Mande (12)	1–0	US Roissy-en-Brie (10)
67.	AS Courdimanche (12)	2–3 (a.e.t.)	US Mauloise (11)
68.	AS Vexin (11)	0–5	CSM Rosny-sur-Seine (11)
69.	FC Bonnières-sur-Seine Freneuse (13)	2–6	St Cloud FC (10)
70.	FC Plateau Bréval Longnes (12)	0–1	USA Clichy (10)
71.	OC Gif Section Foot (11)	5–1	FC Rambouillet Yvelines (11)
72.	US Saclas-Méréville (13)	5–0 (Note: US 17 Tournants not eligible to compete due to starting an entente (partial merger) with AS Cernay-la-Ville and AS Bonnelles. US Saclas-Méréville win the tie by forfeit.)	US 17 Tournants (13)
73.	FC Coignières (13)	3–1	AS Ollainville (12)
74.	AJ Étampoise (14)	1–7	FC Vallée 78 (11)
75.	AS Éragny FC (11)	0–1	Gargenville Stade (10)
76.	Triel AC (14)	1–1 (3–4 p)	ES Frettoise (12)
77.	AS Fontenay-St Père (15)	0–5	ACS Cormeillais (11)
78.	EFC Ecquevilly (15)	void (Note: EFC Ecquevilly forfeited their place in the championship, and are therefore not eligible to compete. AS Beauchamp will travel instead to Mantes-la-Ville FC. See tie 194.)	AS Beauchamp (11)
79.	USC Mantes (15)	1–2	FC Jouy-le-Moutier (11)
80.	FCM Vauréal (13)	4–2	FC Villennes-Orgeval (12)
81.	Mantes-la-Ville FC (15)	void (Note: ES Boissy-L'Allerie not eligible to compete due to starting an entente (partial merger) with Cormeilles-en-Vexin FC and AS Chars. Mantes-la-Ville FC will face AS Beauchamp instead. See tie 194.)	ES Boissy-L'Allerie (14)
82.	FC St Arnoult (14)	4–1	ASL Janville Lardy (11)
83.	FC Région Houdanaise (12)	4–2	Dourdan Sport (11)
84.	AS Issou (13)	2–6	Sèvres FC 92 (12)
85.	ASF Guitrancourt (14)	9–1	Colombes SA (15)
86.	Ablis FC Sud 78 (14)	void (Note: AS Angervilliers not eligible to compete due to starting an entente (partial merger) with Entente Pays du Limours. Ablis FC Sud 78 face CSM Clamart Foot. See tie 193.)	AS Angervilliers (12)
87.	ES Vauxoise (15)	0–8	ES Seizième (10)
88.	FC Orsay-Bures (11)	3–2	FO Plaisirois (11)
89.	US Jouy-en-Josas (12)	1–3	Breuillet FC (11)
90.	Champcueil FC (14)	2–1	JSC Pitray-Olier (11)
91.	AS Sud Essonne (12)	1–3	SS Voltaire Châtenay-Malabry (11)
92.	FC Trois Vallées (13)	0–6	Stade Vanve (10)
93.	FC Chaville (13)	3–4	RC Arpajonnais (11)
94.	AS Bruyères (13)	5–3	USM Malakoff (10)
95.	St Éloi FC (14)	0–4	AS Bourg-la-Reine (14)
96.	FC St Vrain (14)	1–3	AS Montigny-le-Bretonneux (10)
97.	ASL Mesnil St Denis (15)	0–2	FC Longjumeau (11)
98.	Olympique Mantes FC (14)	0–5	FC Asnières (12)
99.	AJ Mézières (16)	1–5	Argenteuil FC (10)
100.	FC Andrésy (12)	0–6	Olympique Viarmes Asnières-sur-Oise (12)
101.	AS Guernoise (13)	2–4 (a.e.t.)	AS Menucourt (11)
102.	AS Guerville-Arnouville (14)	1–2	AS Meudon (12)
103.	AS Cheminots Ouest (14)	0–7	AS Ballainvilliers (12)
104.	Salésienne de Paris (11)	1–0	FC Brunoy (10)
105.	Enfants de Gennevilliers (15)	0–10	FC Athis-Mons (10)
106.	USM Viroflay (15)	3–5	US Ris-Orangis (12)
107.	Garches Vaucresson FC (15)	1–8	FC Portugais US Ris-Orangis (11)
108.	CO Villiers (14)	0–3	AS Bois d'Arcy (11)
109.	SFC Bailly Noisy-le-Roi (11)	3–2	TU Verrières-le-Buisson (10)
110.	Villepreux FC (12)	3–2	Draveil FC (11)
111.	OSC Élancourt (12)	2–3	CO Savigny (11)
112.	FC Villemoisson (13)	0–1	Voisins FC (11)
113.	FC La Verrière (14)	3–1	CO Vigneux (11)
114.	FC Antillais de Vigneux-sur-Seine (14)	0–5	ES Guyancourt St Quentin-en-Yvelines (10)
115.	Juziers FC (14)	0–6	Osny FC (10)
116.	FC Auvers-Ennery (11)	1–5	USBS Épône (10)
117.	AS Carrières Grésillons (11)	2–1	Olympique Montigny (10)
118.	CSM Eaubonne (14)	6–0	Vernolitain Stade (14)
119.	Soisy-Andilly-Margency FC (12)	0–2	US Verneuil-sur-Seine (11)
120.	FC Porcheville (11)	3–4	LSO Colombes (10)
121.	FC Magnanville (12)	3–3 (5–6 p)	Olympique Neuilly (10)
122.	CS Achères (13)	0–3	USO Bezons (12)
123.	AS Neuville-sur-Oise (12)	1–2	US Chanteloup-les-Vignes (11)
124.	Fouilleuse FC (15)	0–5	ASM Chambourcy (11)
125.	Entente Méry-Mériel Bessancourt (11)	3–1	US Hardricourt (10)
126.	Entente Beaumont Mours (12)	4–2	Pierrefitte FC (11)
127.	AS Grenelle (15)	2–7	SO Houilles (13)
128.	Sartrouville FC (11)	0–0 (4–2 p)	Cosmos St Denis FC (10)
129.	Bougival (11)	0–1	FC Groslay (10)
130.	Maisons-Laffitte FC (13)	1–7	ES St Prix (11)
131.	Juvisy AF Essonne (14)	3–3 (5–4 p)	AS Fontenay-le-Fleury (14)
132.	SC Épinay-sur-Orge (11)	5–0	FC Beynes (14)
133.	AS Mesnil-le-Roi (13)	3–9	FC Wissous (12)
134.	Villebon SF (11)	1–2 (a.e.t.)	FC Le Chesnay 78 (10)
135.	Morsang-sur-Orge FC (13)	1–7	ASC Velizy (11)
136.	FC Massy 91 (11)	5–0	USM Les Clayes-sous-Bois (10)
137.	AFC St Cyr (14)	2–2 (2–3 p)	CS Pouchet Paris XVII (12)
138.	JA Montrouge (15)	0–5	US Le Pecq (10)
139.	AJ Antony (13)	1–3	US Marly-le-Roi (11)
140.	ES Petit Anges Paris (13)	1–0	US Croissy (13)
141.	AGS Essarts-le-Roi (13)	void (Note: AGS Essarts-le-Roi not eligible to compete due to starting an entente (partial merger) with ES Le Perray Foot. CSM Clamart Foot travel instead to Ablis FC Sud 78. See tie 193.)	CSM Clamart Foot (11)
142.	AS Maurepas (10)	9–2	Les Petits Pains (14)
143.	Enfants de Passy Paris (15)	1–6	US Carrières-sur-Seine (12)
144.	US Ville d'Avray (12)	5–3	US Montesson (11)
145.	Nicolaïte Chaillot Paris (11)	9–0	AS Versailles Jussieu (14)
146.	AO Buc Foot (13)	0–6	FC Rueil Malmaison (10)
147.	FC St Germain-en-Laye (13)	0–1	AC Paris 15 (10)
148.	US Ézanville-Écouen (12)	1–2	FC Bourget (11)
149.	Paris Gaels FA (12)	2–2 (4–2 p)	RC Gonesse (11)
150.	CO Cheminots Chambly (13)	0–1	ES Stains (11)
151.	US Montsoult-Baillet-Maffliers (14)	1–1 (3–1 p)	Drancy FC (13)
152.	USM Bruyères-Bernes (13)	2–4	USM Audonienne (11)
153.	Aresport Stains 93 (13)	5–3	SFC Champagne 95 (12)
154.	CS Berbère (14)	1–2	AS Ermont (11)
155.	St Denis FC (14)	0–5	US Persan (10)
156.	AFC Île St Denis (13)	1–2	Paris Université Club (10)
157.	AS Victory (14)	4–3	Arronville FC (13)
158.	ACS La Joie de Jouer (14)	1–5	FC Deuil-Enghien (11)
159.	FC Montmorency (13)	2–1	Paris SC (13)
160.	Fosses FU (13)	4–4 (5–4 p) (Note: The original game at the ground of Entraide Franco Egéenne was not played due to the pitch being unavailable. The FFF announced that Entraide Franco Egéenne would be penalised and Fosses FU would qualify for the next round. However, they reversed their decision and ordered the tie to be played at a later date at the ground of Fosses FU.)	Entraide Franco Egéenne (14)
161.	FC Bonneuil-en-France (13)	0–2	Amicale Villeneuve-la-Garenne (11)
162.	CA Romainville (13)	4–1	CS Assyro-Chaldéens Sarcelles (14)
163.	Bouffemont ACF (14)	1–3	Etoiles d'Auber (14)
164.	GAFE Plessis-Bouchard (12)	3–0	Neuilly-Plaisance Sports (12)
165.	FC Domont (12)	1–2	FC Aulnay (11)
166.	US Roissy-en-France (11)	3–1 (a.e.t.)	USM Gagny (11)
167.	Olympique Paris 15 (15)	0–5 (Note: Tie won by forfeit due to Olympique Paris 15 having only 7 players present at kick-off.)	ASC La Courneuve (10)
168.	Paris Alésia FC (11)	1–4	St Maur VGA (10)
169.	ASPTT Villecresnes (14)	2–4 (a.e.t.)	OFC Couronnes (12)
170.	ESC XVème (14)	1–0	Viking Club de Paris (12)
171.	Élan Chevilly-Larue (13)	4–1	AS Homenetmen France (14)
172.	Paris IFA (14)	3–2 (a.e.t.)	Guyane FC Paris (14)
173.	CS Villetaneuse (12)	4–3	Mimosa Mada-Sport (13)
174.	OFC Pantin (10)	3–1	CA Paris-Charenton (10)
175.	CS Ternes Paris-Oueste (14)	1–1 (12–13 p)	Ménilmontant FC 1871 (13)
176.	Benfica Argoselo Sports Paris (15)	0–6	FC Solitaires Paris Est (10)
177.	Parisud FC (15)	1–5	ES Vitry (10)
178.	CSA Kremlin-Bicêtre (12)	2–3	Enfants de la Goutte d'Or (11)
179.	Racine Club Asnières-sur-Seine (14)	3–2	Stade Parisien FC (13)
180.	AS Ultra Marine Paris (12)	5–0	Bagnolet FC (11)
181.	US Yvelines (13)	2–3	Thiais FC (11)
182.	ASAF Perou (13)	2–3	Espérance Paris 19ème (11)
183.	AAS Fresnes (12)	0–5	Panamicaine FC (14)
184.	AS Paris 18è (13)	4–4 (5–3 p)	Phare Sportive Zarzissien (13)
185.	SCM Châtillonnais (10)	4–3	CO Cachan (10)
186.	Stade de l'Est Pavillonnais (10)	0–1	La Camillienne Sports 12ème (11)
187.	UJ Boissy (13)	0–5	AJSC Nanterre (11)
188.	Villeneuve-St Georges FC (14)	0–1	ESC Paris 20 (14)
189.	US Villeneuve Ablon (11)	6–0	JS Paris (14)
190.	AC Gentilly (13)	4–4 (2-4 p)	SC Luth (15)
191.	COSM Arcueil (13)	not played (Note: COSM Arcueil penalised due to not informing the referee or the visiting club of a change of ground.Championnet Sports Paris qualify for the next round.)	Championnet Sports Paris (14)
192.	SC Gretz-Tournan (10)	8–0	FC Champenois-Mammesien-Vernoucellois (13)
193.	Ablis FC Sud 78 (14)	2–4	CSM Clamart Foot (11)
194.	Mantes-la-Ville FC (15)	5–0	AS Beauchamp (11)

== Second round ==
These matches were played on 30 May and 1, 2, 3, 7, 10 and 13 June 2018. Tiers shown reflect the 2017–18 season.

Second round results: Paris-Île-de-France
Tie no	Home team (tier)	Score	Away team (tier)
1.	Vaux-le-Pénil La Rochette FC (10)	2–1	FC Courcouronnes (9)
2.	CO Savigny (11)	7–0 (Note: Match abandoned. ES Nangis penalised by regional disciplinary commission. CO Savigny qualify for the next round.)	ES Nangis (13)
3.	Fontenay-en-Parisis FC (12)	0–4	SFC Neuilly-sur-Marne (8)
4.	FC Montmorency (13)	4–2	AS La Plaine Victoire (14)
5.	SC Épinay-sur-Orge (11)	1–2 (a.e.t.)	AS Choisy-le-Roi (8)
6.	ASC La Courneuve (10)	4–2	FC Écouen (9)
7.	ES Vitry (10)	2–0	ES Trappes (9)
8.	AS Ultra Marine Paris (12)	1–2	US Lognes (9)
9.	Panamicaine FC (14)	0–10	US Alfortville (8)
10.	US Roissy-en-France (11)	1–0 (Note: Tie switched at request of both clubs.)	Championnet Sports Paris (14)
11.	ES Jouy-Yvron (13)	1–4	FC Morangis-Chilly (7)
12.	FC St Germain-Saintry-St Pierre (11)	3–2	UJA Maccabi Paris Métropole (6)
13.	FC St Arnoult (14)	1–8	Montrouge FC 92 (7)
14.	Entente Méry-Mériel Bessancourt (11)	1–2	FC Les Lilas (6)
15.	St Thibault-des-Vignes FC (10)	2–5	CSM Bonneuil-sur-Marne (9)
16.	Magny-le-Hongre FC (11)	2–5	CA Vitry (9)
17.	ASM Ferté-sous-Jouarre (11)	3–6	FC Livry-Gargan (7)
18.	Bondoufle Amical Club (13)	2–4	Gatinais Val de Loing FC (11)
19.	FC Longjumeau (11)	4–0	FC Nandy (10)
20.	FC Milly-la-Forêt (12)	0–6	CO Vincennes (8)
21.	UF Clichois (10)	0–2	Courbevoie Sports (8)
22.	FC La Plaine de France (12)	1–6	AS Bondy (10)
23.	Bussy St Georges FC (11)	0–5	FC Villepinte (11)
24.	JS Bondy (13)	1–4	CS Brétigny (6)
25.	ASC Réunionnais de Sénart (13)	2–4	ES Parisienne (9)
26.	USA Clichy (10)	0–0 (4–3 p)	Neauphle-le-Château-Pontchartrain RC 78 (7)
27.	CS Mennecy (11)	5–1	CA Combs-la-Ville (10)
28.	Grigny FC (13)	1–2	ES Cesson Vert St Denis (8)
29.	Portugais Pontault-Combault (10)	0–2	FC Athis-Mons (10)
30.	FC Intercommunal Loing (11)	4–5	Tremplin Foot (9)
31.	ES Villabé (11)	1–4	SC Gretz-Tournan (10)
32.	SC Briard (10)	1–13	Champigny FC 94 (7)
33.	US Ponthierry (10)	2–3	Breuillet FC (11)
34.	Aigle Fertoise Boissy le Cutté (12)	1–1 (5–4 p)	Entente Bagneaux Nemours Saint-Pierre (10)
35.	Villepinte Flamboyants (10)	0–2	Sucy FC (6)
36.	UF Portugais Meaux (13)	2–3	ASF Le Perreux (10)
37.	AS Éclair de Puiseux (12)	0–4	Montreuil Red Star (6)
38.	US Centre Brie (13)	1–5	FC Boussy-Quincy (11)
39.	FC Cosmo 77 (12)	1–4	FC Bry (9)
40.	ESM Thillay-Vaudherland (13)	0–12	St Denis US (7)
41.	AS Arnouville (12)	1–1 (13–12 p)	AS Chelles (11)
42.	AS Collégien (12)	1–3	ASS Noiséenne (13)
43.	ASA Montereau (9)	1–4	Val Yerres Crosne AF (8)
44.	FC Étampes (9)	1–3	COM Bagneux (9)
45.	ES Marly-la-Ville (9)	2–4	AC Houilles (8)
46.	US Grigny (8)	1–1 (8–7 p)	US Rungis (6)
47.	Pays Créçois FC (11)	1–8	Noisy-le-Grand FC (8)
48.	AS Paris (12)	3–2	Thiais FC (11)
49.	CSM Rosny-sur-Seine (11)	0–5	RFC Argenteuil (8)
50.	OC Gif Section Foot (11)	1–0	US Mauloise (11)
51.	US Saclas-Méréville (13)	0–5 (Note: Tie won by forfeit.)	FC Melun (6)
52.	FC Coignières (13)	0–3	Antony Sports (7)
53.	FC Vallée 78 (11)	0–0 (3–5 p)	ASA Issy (7)
54.	Paris Gaels FA (12)	0–2	Conflans FC (7)
55.	Champcueil FC (14)	2–1	Savigny-le-Temple FC (11)
56.	RC Arpajonnais (11)	1–3 (a.e.t.)	Le Mée Sports (6)
57.	FC Asnières (12)	6–0	AS Paris 18è (13)
58.	AS Meudon (12)	5–0	FC Région Houdanaise (12)
59.	Villepreux FC (12)	1–4	FC Parisis (9)
60.	Voisins FC (11)	2–0	FC Jouy-le-Moutier (11)
61.	FC La Verrière (14)	1–3 (a.e.t.)	FC Orsay-Bures (11)
62.	Osny FC (10)	3–0	Aubergenville FC (9)
63.	USBS Épône (10)	4–3	ACS Cormeillais (11)
64.	CSM Eaubonne (14)	1–4	AS Chatou (8)
65.	USO Bezons (12)	1–2 (a.e.t.)	Gargenville Stade (10)
66.	ASM Chambourcy (11)	1–4	FC Igny (9)
67.	Entente Beaumont Mours (12)	1–5	Épinay Académie (9)
68.	FC Groslay (10)	1–5	FC Montfermeil (9)
69.	ES St Prix (11)	1–6	ES Colombienne (8)
70.	ES Petit Anges Paris (13)	12–0	Mantes-la-Ville FC (15)
71.	FC Rueil Malmaison (10)	0–1	SFC Bailly Noisy-le-Roi (11)
72.	ASF Guitrancourt (14)	1–0	ES Montreuil (12)
73.	GAFE Plessis-Bouchard (12)	0–5	CSM Gennevilliers (9)
74.	LSO Colombes (10)	3–4	ALJ Limay (8)
75.	Olympique Adamois (8)	1–2	ES Nanterre (7)
76.	FCM Vauréal (13)	3–0	Etoiles d'Auber (14)
77.	Olympique Viarmes Asnières-sur-Oise (12)	2–3	Olympique Neuilly (10)
78.	US Marly-le-Roi (11)	2–1	USM Audonienne (11)
79.	Ménilmontant FC 1871 (13)	1–2	Argenteuil FC (10)
80.	Nicolaïte Chaillot Paris (11)	2–1	FC Solitaires Paris Est (10)
81.	AJSC Nanterre (11)	3–0	FC Romainville (11)
82.	US Villeneuve Ablon (11)	0–1	SC Luth (15)
83.	FC Bourget (11)	5–0	US Montsoult-Baillet-Maffliers (14)
84.	Espérance Paris 19ème (11)	0–8	FC St Leu (7)
85.	UF Créteil (11)	3–2	AS Soisy-sur-Seine (10)
86.	ES Frettoise (12)	2–5	AS Carrières Grésillons (11)
87.	ES Guyancourt St Quentin-en-Yvelines (10)	3–5	AC Paris 15 (10)
88.	SO Houilles (13)	2–2 (0–3 p)	Paris IFA (14)
89.	Juvisy AF Essonne (14)	2–9	ASC Velizy (11)
90.	US Carrières-sur-Seine (12)	1–0	CS Villetaneuse (12)
91.	Paris Université Club (10)	2–3	US Vaires-sur-Marne (9)
92.	ESC XVème (14)	1–4	FC Le Chesnay 78 (10)
93.	AS Ballainvilliers (12)	2–4	La Camillienne Sports 12ème (11)
94.	FC St Mande (12)	1–4	UMS Pontault-Combault (11)
95.	St Cloud FC (10)	1–0	AAS Sarcelles (9)
96.	US Torcy (7)	0–1	Espérance Aulnay (8)
97.	CO Othis (12)	2–3	FC Aulnay (11)
98.	AS Le Pin-Villevaude (11)	3–2	FC Gournay (12)
99.	FC Nogent-sur-Marne (11)	0–2	AS Montigny-le-Bretonneux (10)
100.	Goellycompans FC (12)	3–3 (1–3 p)	Sevran FC (10)
101.	Mitry-Mory (10)	6–1	AS Victory (14)
102.	US Le Pecq (10)	0–3	ES Seizième (10)
103.	AS Bourg-la-Reine (14)	1–6	OFC Couronnes (12)
104.	US Ris-Orangis (12)	6–3 (a.e.t.)	Salésienne de Paris (11)
105.	US Ormesson-sur-Marne (11)	3–2	FC Massy 91 (11)
106.	FC Coubronnais (12)	4–2	FC Esperanto (13)
107.	AS Bois d'Arcy (11)	3–1	US Ville d'Avray (12)
108.	FC Lissois (12)	0–5	Val d'Europe FC (7)
109.	SS Noiseau (14)	2–0	Racine Club Asnières-sur-Seine (14)
110.	Stade Vanve (10)	6–3 (a.e.t.)	Val de France Foot (9)
111.	AS Menucourt (11)	2–4	USM Villeparisis (9)
112.	FC Portugais US Ris-Orangis (11)	3–1	US Avonnaise (9)
113.	US Verneuil-sur-Seine (11)	5–1	CA Paris (9)
114.	FC Franconville (9)	0–5	Issy-les-Moulineaux (7)
115.	US Chanteloup-les-Vignes (11)	1–2	AF Garenne-Colombes (6)
116.	Sartrouville FC (11)	0–0 (Note: Match abandoned by the referee after a player was attacked by the crowd. Sartrouville FC subsequently penalised. St Brice FC qualify.)	St Brice FC (6)
117.	US Villejuif (9)	1–1 (4–3 p)	CS Meaux Academy (6)
118.	Évry FC (7)	1–3	Claye-Souilly SF (8)
119.	AS Maurepas (10)	– (Note: Match abandoned in extra time by the referee, with the scoreline 3–3, after a fight between players was followed by a pitch invasion. AS Maurepas subsequently penalised. FC Plessis-Robinson qualify.)	FC Plessis-Robinson (7)
120.	ES Stains (11)	4–1 (a.e.t.)	JS Suresnes (9)
121.	SS Voltaire Châtenay-Malabry (11)	3–3 (2–4 p)	AS Ermont (11)
122.	US Persan (10)	2–4	Villemomble Sports (7)
123.	FC Deuil-Enghien (11)	3–1	Aresport Stains 93 (13)
124.	Amicale Villeneuve-la-Garenne (11)	2–1	Cosmo Taverny (9)
125.	CA Romainville (13)	5–6	SCM Châtillonnais (10)
126.	FC Maisons Alfort (9)	6–1	ES Montgeron (10)
127.	St Maur VGA (10)	2–3	FC Ozoir-la-Ferrière 77 (9)
128.	CSM Puteaux (9)	2–0	FC Goussainville (9)
129.	Élan Chevilly-Larue (13)	0–3	US Palaiseau (9)
130.	OFC Pantin (10)	2–0	US Fontenay-sous-Bois (9)
131.	CSM Clamart Foot (11)	4–3	ESA Linas-Montlhéry (6)
132.	Enfants de la Goutte d'Or (11)	4–2	Paray FC (8)
133.	ESC Paris 20 (14)	1–2	FC Wissous (12)
134.	CS Pouchet Paris XVII (12)	3–2	AS Bruyères (13)
135.	Sèvres FC 92 (12)	6–2	Fosses FU (13)
136.	CSL Aulnay (8)	5–3	Cergy Pontoise FC (6)

== Third round ==
These matches were played on 16 September 2018.

Third round results: Paris-Île-de-France (Note: Four second round winners were given byes in the third round draw: FC St Germain-Saintry-St Pierre, CSM Bonneuil-sur-Marne, FC Plessis-Robinson and CSM Clamart Foot)
Tie no	Home team (tier)	Score	Away team (tier)
1.	COM Bagneux (8)	3–2	FC Le Chesnay 78 (9)
2.	ES Petit Anges Paris (12)	0–5	SC Luth (13)
3.	FC Longjumeau (10)	0–3	AS Saint-Ouen-l'Aumône (6)
4.	US Vaires-sur-Marne (8)	1–4	Argenteuil FC (10)
5.	ES Vitry (9)	3–5 (a.e.t.)	CSM Gennevilliers (7)
6.	CS Mennecy (10)	0–3	Montrouge FC 92 (7)
7.	CSM Puteaux (8)	2–4	ES Viry-Châtillon (6)
8.	ASS Noiséenne (12)	0–1	US Verneuil-sur-Seine (10)
9.	Mitry-Mory (8)	1–0	Olympique Neuilly (9)
10.	Aigle Fertoise Boissy le Cutté (11)	1–5	CSL Aulnay (7)
11.	US Ormesson-sur-Marne (10)	0–6	FC Versailles 78 (5)
12.	AS Bondy (9)	1–2	Conflans FC (6)
13.	AS Ermont (10)	2–0	AS Bois d'Arcy (10)
14.	ASC La Courneuve (9)	3–1	La Camillienne Sports 12ème (10)
15.	FC Les Lilas (6)	1–2	Claye-Souilly SF (7)
16.	FCM Aubervilliers (5)	8–1 (Note: Tie switched at the request of both clubs.)	UMS Pontault-Combault (9)
17.	FC Boussy-Quincy (10)	1–5	AS Chatou (6)
18.	Nicolaïte Chaillot Paris (10)	7–0	UF Créteil (11)
19.	FC Deuil-Enghien (10)	1–3	US Villejuif (7)
20.	FC Portugais US Ris-Orangis (11)	4–0	CS Pouchet Paris XVII (12)
21.	USBS Épône (10)	1–0	Villemomble Sports (7)
22.	US Alfortville (8)	3–2 (a.e.t.)	St Denis US (6)
23.	FC Villepinte (10)	0–4	Racing Colombes 92 (5)
24.	AC Houilles (7)	3–1	FC Parisis (8)
25.	ES Cesson Vert St Denis (7)	1–2	CO Les Ulis (5)
26.	CO Savigny (9)	0–4	Olympique Noisy-le-Sec (5)
27.	ASF Guitrancourt (13)	0–11 (Note: Match abandoned after 60 minutes with the scoreline 0–11 due to ASF Guitrancourt having less than 8 players remaining. ASF Guitrancourt penalised. Sucy FC qualify.)	Sucy FC (6)
28.	OFC Couronnes (10)	0–7	Issy-les-Moulineaux (7)
29.	FC Athis-Mons (10)	0–1	ES Stains (10)
30.	OFC Pantin (8)	1–2	FC Gobelins Paris 13 (5)
31.	AS Carrières Grésillons (9)	2–1	Val d'Europe FC (6)
32.	SC Gretz-Tournan (10)	4–2	ASA Issy (7)
33.	Enfants de la Goutte d'Or (10)	1–5	FC St Leu (6)
34.	Stade Vanve (9)	– (Note: Sevran FC suspended for not being up to date with financial payments to the league. Stade Vanve qualify.)	Sevran FC (9)
35.	FC Bourget (9)	2–0	USA Clichy (10)
36.	OC Gif Section Foot (10)	0–5	SFC Neuilly-sur-Marne (7)
37.	SCM Châtillonnais (9)	1–2	US Sénart-Moissy (6)
38.	USM Villeparisis (8)	2–1	CA Vitry (7)
39.	AJSC Nanterre (10)	1–6	FC Livry-Gargan (7)
40.	ASC Velizy (10)	3–2	FC Asnières (11)
41.	St Cloud FC (9)	1–5	US Ivry (5)
42.	US Ris-Orangis (10)	1–3	ES Seizième (9)
43.	Osny FC (8)	1–1 (2–3 p)	Gargenville Stade (9)
44.	FC Melun (6)	– (Note: Tie switched due to AS Paris being unable to provide a pitch.) (Note: AS Paris suspended for not being up to date with financial payments to the league. FC Melun qualify.)	AS Paris (10)
45.	FC Wissous (11)	1–4	FC Igny (8)
46.	ALJ Limay (7)	2–2 (4–2 p)	CS Brétigny (5)
47.	Gatinais Val de Loing FC (10)	1–2	US Palaiseau (7)
48.	OFC Les Mureaux (5)	2–0	Montreuil Red Star (6)
49.	FC Bry (9)	0–3	AC Paris 15 (8)
50.	Paris IFA (12)	1–4	FC Morangis-Chilly (7)
51.	SFC Bailly Noisy-le-Roi (10)	1–2	US Grigny (7)
52.	FC Montfermeil (7)	1–4	Val Yerres Crosne AF (7)
53.	US Carrières-sur-Seine (10)	2–0	Épinay Académie (8)
54.	Vaux-le-Pénil La Rochette FC (9)	1–0 (Note: Tie switched due to Champcueil FC being unable to provide a pitch.)	Champcueil FC (13)
55.	FCM Vauréal (11)	0–1	Blanc Mesnil SF (5)
56.	Breuillet FC (10)	2–1	Amicale Villeneuve-la-Garenne (9)
57.	FC Montmorency (11)	0–7	CO Vincennes (6)
58.	FC Ozoir-la-Ferrière 77 (7)	0–1	St Brice FC (6)
59.	FC Orsay-Bures (10)	0–4	ES Nanterre (7)
60.	US Marly-le-Roi (9)	2–3	US Roissy-en-France (10)
61.	US Lognes (8)	0–1	Courbevoie Sports (7)
62.	FC Aulnay (10)	2–6	FC Maisons Alfort (8)
63.	ES Colombienne (7)	2–1	Champigny FC 94 (7)
64.	SS Noiseau (12)	0–3 (Note: Tie won by forfeit.)	Tremplin Foot (8)
65.	ASF Le Perreux (9)	0–1	RFC Argenteuil (7)
66.	AS Le Pin-Villevaude (10)	1–5	Le Mée Sports (5)
67.	AS Montigny-le-Bretonneux (10)	0–0 (5–3 p)	AS Choisy-le-Roi (7)
68.	AS Arnouville (11)	0–10	Espérance Aulnay (7)
69.	Sèvres FC 92 (10)	0–1	Voisins FC (10)
70.	AF Garenne-Colombes (6)	0–0 (4–3 p)	ES Parisienne (7)
71.	FC Coubronnais (11)	3–4	AS Meudon (11)
72.	Antony Sports (none)	– (Note: Antony Sports folded during the time since the previous round. Noisy-le-Grand FC awarded a walkover.)	Noisy-le-Grand FC (6)

== Fourth round ==
These matches were played on 29 and 30 September 2018.

Fourth round results: Paris-Île-de-France
Tie no	Home team (tier)	Score	Away team (tier)
1.	ES Viry-Châtillon (6)	1–0	AS Chatou (6)
2.	AF Bobigny (4)	0–0 (5–3 p)	Racing Colombes 92 (5)
3.	Breuillet FC (10)	1–5	Noisy-le-Grand FC (6)
4.	COM Bagneux (8)	2–2 (1–4 p)	FC Melun (6)
5.	FC St Leu (6)	0–1	FCM Aubervilliers (5)
6.	AS Meudon (11)	0–2	AS Saint-Ouen-l'Aumône (6)
7.	ES Seizième (9)	0–3	FC Gobelins Paris 13 (5)
8.	Espérance Aulnay (7)	0–1 (a.e.t.)	CO Les Ulis (5)
9.	Val Yerres Crosne AF (7)	3–0	ALJ Limay (7)
10.	FC Maisons Alfort (8)	0–4	OFC Les Mureaux (5)
11.	ASC La Courneuve (9)	2–3	US Ivry (5)
12.	US Sénart-Moissy (6)	0–2	Blanc Mesnil SF (5)
13.	CSM Bonneuil-sur-Marne (8)	2–2 (4–1 p)	US Palaiseau (7)
14.	Argenteuil FC (10)	1–2	ES Colombienne (7)
15.	CO Vincennes (6)	2–0 (a.e.t.)	US Villejuif (7)
16.	Sainte-Geneviève Sports (4)	4–0	Le Mée Sports (5)
17.	ASC Velizy (10)	1–7	Athletic Club de Boulogne-Billancourt (4)
18.	US Roissy-en-France (10)	1–6	AS Carrières Grésillons (9)
19.	US Alfortville (8)	1–7	AS Poissy (4)
20.	SC Gretz-Tournan (10)	0–1	St Brice FC (6)
21.	Stade Vanve (9)	0–1	USBS Épône (10)
22.	ES Nanterre (7)	2–1	SFC Neuilly-sur-Marne (7)
23.	FC St Germain-Saintry-St Pierre (10)	4–1	FC Bourget (9)
24.	USM Villeparisis (8)	0–2	US Lusitanos Saint-Maur (4)
25.	Vaux-le-Pénil La Rochette FC (9)	5–0	Nicolaïte Chaillot Paris (10)
26.	FC Versailles 78 (5)	3–0	Sucy FC (6)
27.	CSM Clamart Foot (10)	0–2	CSL Aulnay (7)
28.	Voisins FC (10)	1–2	Tremplin Foot (8)
29.	Courbevoie Sports (7)	0–2	FC Plessis-Robinson (6)
30.	AS Ermont (10)	2–1	Issy-les-Moulineaux (7)
31.	FC Portugais US Ris-Orangis (11)	0–12	Claye-Souilly SF (7)
32.	US Verneuil-sur-Seine (10)	2–1 (a.e.t.)	Olympique Noisy-le-Sec (5)
33.	Mitry-Mory (8)	0–1	US Créteil-Lusitanos (4)
34.	AC Houilles (7)	1–1 (4–3 p)	FC Mantes (4)
35.	Gargenville Stade (9)	0–1	FC Livry-Gargan (7)
36.	SC Luth (13)	1–2	RFC Argenteuil (7)
37.	FC Morangis-Chilly (7)	2–2 (2–4 p)	US Grigny (7)
38.	ES Stains (10)	2–2 (6–7 p)	Conflans FC (6)
39.	AC Paris 15 (8)	2–1	AF Garenne-Colombes (6)
40.	Montrouge FC 92 (7)	1–3	FC Igny (8)
41.	CSM Gennevilliers (7)	2–5	FC Fleury 91 (4)
42.	US Carrières-sur-Seine (10)	2–1	AS Montigny-le-Bretonneux (10)

== Fifth round ==
These matches were played on 13 and 14 October 2018.

Fifth round results: Paris-Île-de-France
Tie no	Home team (tier)	Score	Away team (tier)
1.	AC Paris 15 (8)	4–1	St Brice FC (6)
2.	Val Yerres Crosne AF (7)	1–0	Athletic Club de Boulogne-Billancourt (4)
3.	FC Igny (8)	1–3 (a.e.t.)	FC Melun (6)
4.	FC Livry-Gargan (7)	2–3 (a.e.t.)	AS Poissy (4)
5.	Vaux-le-Pénil La Rochette FC (9)	2–5	Sainte-Geneviève Sports (4)
6.	CSL Aulnay (7)	0–2	ES Nanterre (7)
7.	FC St Germain-Saintry-St Pierre (10)	1–3	FC Versailles 78 (5)
8.	ES Colombienne (7)	1–2	US Créteil-Lusitanos (4)
9.	AS Saint-Ouen-l'Aumône (6)	2–3	Blanc Mesnil SF (5)
10.	Claye-Souilly SF (7)	4–0	Tremplin Foot (8)
11.	FC Plessis-Robinson (6)	1–2	JA Drancy (3)
12.	US Verneuil-sur-Seine (10)	3–1	RFC Argenteuil (7)
13.	AS Ermont (10)	0–3	FC Gobelins Paris 13 (5)
14.	US Lusitanos Saint-Maur (4)	1–1 (4–3 p)	OFC Les Mureaux (5)
15.	Conflans FC (6)	1–2	FC Fleury 91 (4)
16.	USBS Épône (10)	0–3	AF Bobigny (4)
17.	CO Les Ulis (5)	1–2	FCM Aubervilliers (5)
18.	AS Carrières Grésillons (9)	3–2	CSM Bonneuil-sur-Marne (8)
19.	US Grigny (7)	0–5	L'Entente SSG (3)
20.	CO Vincennes (6)	1–2	ES Viry-Châtillon (6)
21.	US Carrières-sur-Seine (10)	1–6	Noisy-le-Grand FC (6)
22.	AC Houilles (7)	0–0 (5–6 p)	US Ivry (5)

== Sixth round ==
These matches were played on 27 and 28 October 2018.

Sixth round results: Paris-Île-de-France
Tie no	Home team (tier)	Score	Away team (tier)
1.	Claye-Souilly SF (7)	1–2	AF Bobigny (4)
2.	Blanc Mesnil SF (5)	0–3 (a.e.t.)	L'Entente SSG (3)
3.	AC Paris 15 (8)	1–1 (2–4 p)	Noisy-le-Grand FC (6)
4.	FC Melun (6)	2–2 (4–2 p)	Val Yerres Crosne AF (7)
5.	FC Fleury 91 (4)	0–0 (1–3 p)	US Lusitanos Saint-Maur (4)
6.	ES Nanterre (7)	0–1	FC Versailles 78 (5)
7.	AS Poissy (4)	2–2 (1–4 p)	JA Drancy (3)
8.	Sainte-Geneviève Sports (4)	2–0	US Ivry (5)
9.	AS Carrières Grésillons (9)	1–0	US Verneuil-sur-Seine (10)
10.	US Créteil-Lusitanos (4)	6–0	FC Gobelins Paris 13 (5)
11.	ES Viry-Châtillon (6)	2–1	FCM Aubervilliers (5)
