= 2020–21 Coupe de France preliminary rounds, Paris-Île-de-France =

The 2020–21 Coupe de France preliminary rounds, Paris-Île-de-France was the qualifying competition to decide which teams from the leagues of the Paris-Île-de-France region of France took part in the main competition from the seventh round.

A total of nine teams qualified from the Paris-Île-de-France preliminary rounds. In 2019–20, Red Star progressed furthest in the main competition, reaching the round of 32 before losing to Nice 2–1.

== Schedule ==
On 17 July 2020, the league announced that a preliminary round would be required, due to the reduction of teams qualifying for the seventh round, and that this round would take place on 30 August 2020. This round involved 248 teams from the District leagues. The remaining 126 teams from the District leagues entered at the first round stage, which took place on 6 September. The second round on 13 September saw the entry of the teams from the Regional leagues.

The third round draw, which saw the entry into the competition of the Championnat National 3 teams, was made on 15 September 2020. The fourth round draw, which saw the entry into the competition of the Championnat National 2 teams, was made on 24 September 2020. The fifth round draw, which saw the two Championnat National teams from the region join the competition, was made on 7 October 2020. The sixth round draw was made on 20 October 2020.

=== Preliminary round ===
These matches were played on 30 August 2020.

Preliminary round results: Paris-Île-de-France
| Tie no | Home team (tier) | Score | Away team (tier) |
|---|---|---|---|
| 1. | FC Nogent-sur-Marne (10) | 1–2 | FC Solitaires Paris Est (9) |
| 2. | FC Vallée 78 (9) | 3–0 (Note: Tie Reversed from original draw.) (Note: ASL Janville Lardy did not show for the match. FC Vallée 78 qualify by means of forfeit.) | ASL Janville Lardy (11) |
| 3. | FC Guignes (12) | 0–1 | SC Épinay-sur-Orge (10) |
| 4. | Neuilly-Plaisance Sports (12) | 3–2 | Fontenay-en-Parisis FC (11) |
| 5. | US Jouy-en-Josas (11) | 1–2 | Paris Université Club (10) |
| 6. | AS Sud Essonne (10) | 2–2 (4–5 p) | Entente Bagneaux Nemours Saint-Pierre (10) |
| 7. | FS Esbly (11) | 0–4 | FC Puiseux-Louvres (11) |
| 8. | ASL Mesnil Saint-Denis (13) | 2–6 | USM Malakoff (11) |
| 9. | OSC Élancourt (10) | 4–4 (3–4 p) | Argenteuil FC (9) |
| 10. | Morsang-sur-Orge FC (10) | 5–0 | AC Orly (10) |
| 11. | AC Mantais (13) | 3–0 (Note: Tie won by means of forfeit.) | AS Neuville-sur-Oise (12) |
| 12. | Bondoufle AC (11) | 3–6 | FC Moret-Veneux Sablons (10) |
| 13. | Espérance Provins-Sourdun FC (11) | 0–2 | CSM Bonneuil-sur-Marne (9) |
| 14. | AC Villenoy (11) | 0–4 | USM Gagny (10) |
| 15. | FC Auvers-Ennery (10) | 2–1 | FC Villepinte (10) |
| 16. | ES Montreuil (10) | 0–3 | CO Savigny (9) |
| 17. | US Ézanville-Écouen (10) | 1–4 | Flamboyants Villepinte (9) |
| 18. | FC La Plaine de France (11) | 0–2 | Neuilly-Plaisance Sports (11) |
| 19. | US Roissy-en-Brie (9) | 4–0 | CS Valenton (11) |
| 20. | FC Montmorency (11) | 2–6 | FC Romainville (10) |
| 21. | Les Petits Pains (14) | 1–3 | Olympique Mantes (13) |
| 22. | FC Domont (10) | 1–3 | USBS Épône (9) |
| 23. | FC Trois Vallées (12) | 0–2 | ES Guyancourt Saint-Quentin-en-Yvelines (10) |
| 24. | ASM Chambourcy (11) | 6–1 | Villebon SF (10) |
| 25. | Mimosa Mada-Sport (12) | 3–0 (Note: AS Collégien did not show for the match. Mimosa Mada-Sport qualify by means of forfeit.) | AS Collégien (10) |
| 26. | FO Plaisirois (10) | 2–2 (3–4 p) | LSO Colombes (9) |
| 27. | Savigny-le-Temple FC (10) | 2–0 | Dourdan Sport (9) |
| 28. | Sèvres FC 92 (10) | 2–0 | US Le Pecq (10) |
| 29. | AS Saint-Mard (11) | 4–0 | AS Arnouville (11) |
| 30. | Villeneuve-Saint-Georges FC (12) | 2–5 | Saint-Thibault-des-Vignes FC (10) |
| 31. | US Lagny Messagers (11) | 0–3 | UF Clichois (9) |
| 32. | FC Andrésy (12) | 0–1 | Entente Méry-Mériel Bessancourt (10) |
| 33. | Mantes-la-Ville FC (13) | 2–2 (5–3 p) | AS Courdimanche (11) |
| 34. | CA L'Haÿ-les-Roses (11) | 1–3 | ASA Montereau (9) |
| 35. | Stade Vernolitain (13) | 0–3 (Note: Stade Vernolitain did not show for the match. BO Attitude qualify by means of forfeit.) | BO Attitude (14) |
| 36. | US Changis-Saint-Jean-Ussy (10) | 2–0 | AS Bondy (10) |
| 37. | Ablis FC Sud 78 (13) | 0–5 | Breuillet FC (10) |
| 38. | FC Chaville (11) | 1–2 | Sartrouville FC (9) |
| 39. | FC Longjumeau (10) | 2–0 | AS Ultra Marine Vitry (10) |
| 40. | FC Fontenay-le-Fleury (12) | 3–3 (4–3 p) | FC Asnières (11) |
| 41. | AS Éclair de Puiseux (12) | 3–0 | US Speals (13) |
| 42. | US Lognes (9) | 2–1 | OFC Couronnes (10) |
| 43. | FC Cosmo 77 (11) | 1–0 | Ménilmontant FC 1871 (11) |
| 44. | GAFE Plessis-Bouchard (12) | 3–3 (4–5 p) | SC Luth (12) |
| 45. | CS Berbère (10) | 1–2 | SO Houilles (10) |
| 46. | Olympique Loing (10) | 0–3 | AJ Limeil-Brévannes (9) |
| 47. | Coulommiers Brie (12) | 3–0 (Note: Montreuil Souvenir 93 did not show for the match. Coulommiers Brie qualify by means of forfeit.) | Montreuil Souvenir 93 (12) |
| 48. | USM Audonienne (13) | 0–3 | FC Parisis (9) |
| 49. | Héricy-Vulaines-Samoreau FC (11) | 3–2 | ES Villabé (11) |
| 50. | ESM Thillay-Vaudherland (11) | 2–2 (2–3 p) | Cosmos Saint-Denis FC (10) |
| 51. | EFC Ecquevilly (12) | 3–2 | AS Vexin (11) |
| 52. | Paris Alésia FC (10) | 2–2 (6–5 p) | US Montesson (10) |
| 53. | SO Vertois (13) | 2–3 | FC Rambouillet Yvelines (10) |
| 54. | Drancy FC (13) | 4–8 | La Camillienne Sports 12ème (10) |
| 55. | ES Frettoise (11) | 0–3 | AS Paris (10) |
| 56. | FC Région Houdanaise (10) | 0–4 | AS Éragny FC (10) |
| 57. | Nicolaïte Chaillot Paris (10) | 4–2 | US Chanteloup-les-Vignes (10) |
| 58. | AAS Fresnes (10) | – | CSM Clamart Foot (10) |
| 59. | Antony Football Evolution (13) | 9–1 | Viking Club de Paris (11) |
| 60. | FC Épinay Athletico (11) | 0–0 (9–8 p) | US Boissise-Pringy-Orgenoy (10) |
| 61. | Olympique Viarmes Asnières-sur-Oise (11) | 3–0 | FA Le Raincy (10) |
| 62. | AS Bourg-la-Reine (12) | 0–3 | ASF Le Perreux (9) |
| 63. | FC Saint-Arnoult (13) | 6–1 | US Saclas-Méréville (12) |
| 64. | US Montsoult-Baillet-Maffliers (12) | 0–3 | CS Villetaneuse (11) |
| 65. | Maisons-Laffitte FC (12) | 3–0 | ES Petit Anges Paris (12) |
| 66. | JSC Pitray-Olier (11) | 3–2 | Thiais FC (10) |
| 67. | USO Bezons (10) | 6–2 | FC Magnanville (9) |
| 68. | US Quincy-Voisins FC (9) | 2–5 | CO Cachan (9) |
| 69. | FC Maurecourt (13) | 7–0 | Enfants de Gennevilliers (14) |
| 70. | Thorigny FC (10) | 1–2 | ES Villiers-sur-Marne (10) |
| 71. | US Carrières-sur-Seine (11) | 1–0 | Olympique Neuilly (9) |
| 72. | ESC XVème (13) | 0–1 | FC Wissous (9) |
| 73. | AS Issou (12) | 3–4 | FC Jouy-le-Moutier (10) |
| 74. | CS Cellois (13) | 7–1 | AS Grenelle (14) |
| 75. | FC Boissy (11) | 4–0 | ASC Velizy (10) |
| 76. | FC Dammarie-lès-Lys (12) | 1–3 | AJ Étampoise (11) |
| 77. | CS Dammartin (12) | 1–7 | Stade de l'Est Pavillonnais (9) |
| 78. | SS Noiseau (12) | 4–1 | FC Mormant (11) |
| 79. | FC Porcheville (11) | 1–4 | Olympique Montigny (9) |
| 80. | SO Rosny-sous-Bois (12) | 3–1 | CA Lizéen (12) |
| 81. | AS Fontenaisienne (14) | 0–3 | AFC Saint-Cyr (13) |
| 82. | US Paris XIème (13) | 0–3 | AS Outre-Mer du Bois l'Abbé (12) |
| 83. | AS Cheminots Ouest (13) | 2–2 (5–4 p) | USC Mantes (12) |
| 84. | FC Boissy-sous-Saint-Yon (13) | 3–2 | ES Perray (13) |
| 85. | US Croissy (11) | 0–1 | CA Paris 14 (9) |
| 86. | AS Beauchamp (12) | 1–4 | CSM Rosny-sur-Seine (10) |
| 87. | AS Ballainvilliers (10) | 2–2 (2–4 p) | US Ponthierry (10) |
| 88. | Magny-le-Hongre FC (11) | 2–1 | Étoiles d'Auber (12) |
| 89. | CS Ternes Paris-Ouest (14) | 0–3 | Bougival Foot (12) |
| 90. | USA Clichy (10) | 3–0 | Aubergenville FC (9) |
| 91. | AS Versailles Jussieu (13) | 0–3 | Guyane FC Paris (13) |
| 92. | FC Chevry Cossigny 77 (11) | 0–6 | CO Vigneux (10) |
| 93. | Alliance 77 Évry-Grégy-Solers (12) | 0–8 | Lisses Foot 91 (13) |
| 94. | AFL Gazeran (13) | 2–2 (5–3 p) | OC Gif Section Foot (10) |
| 95. | Champs FC (11) | 1–6 | Paris IFA (11) |
| 96. | Olympique Paris 15 (13) | 2–7 | AS La Plaine Victoire (12) |
| 97. | Noyers FC (12) | – (Note: Match did not take place due to Noyers FC not supplying a fully marked out pitch. Courty Foot qualify.) | Courtry Foot (11) |
| 98. | Champcueil FC (13) | 0–3 | FC Varennes 77 (12) |
| 99. | Entente Beaumont Mours (12) | 0–3 | ES Saint-Pathus-Oissery (11) |
| 100. | ES La Fôret (11) | 1–1 (3–5 p) | Aigle Fertoise Boissy le Cutté (11) |
| 101. | Sevran FC (10) | 2–2 (4–3 p) | Portugais Pontault-Combault (9) |
| 102. | FC Coudraysien (13) | 3–1 | Vaux-le-Pénil La Rochette FC (10) |
| 103. | Fosses FU (11) | 4–1 | CA Romainville (12) |
| 104. | Santeny SL (12) | 0–2 | Villeneuve AFC (12) |
| 105. | Parmain AC (12) | – (Note: JA Paris withdrew from the competition.) | JA Paris (12) |
| 106. | JA Montrouge (14) | 1–4 | Goutte d'Or FC (13) |
| 107. | Stade Français (14) | 1–6 | FC Coignières (10) |
| 108. | ASPTT Villecresnes (11) | 0–5 | FC Servon (11) |
| 109. | Benfica Argoselo Sports Paris (14) | 0–4 | Vinsky FC (13) |
| 110. | AS Fourqueux (13) | 1–1 (6–7 p) | Garches Vaucresson FC (13) |
| 111. | FC Bry (11) | 0–9 | ASS Noiséenne (10) |
| 112. | AF Paris 18 (13) | 3–0 | CO Othis (10) |
| 113. | ES Saint-Prix (10) | 1–3 | ESC Paris 20 (10) |
| 114. | US Roissy-en-France (10) | 0–0 (7–6 p) | Entraide Franco Egéenne (11) |
| 115. | FC Plateau Bréval Longnes (13) | 1–7 | FCM Vauréal (10) |
| 116. | Juvisy AF Essonne (13) | 2–6 | FC Émerainville (10) |
| 117. | FC Coubronnais (11) | 2–6 | USF Trilport (10) |
| 118. | JS Pontoisienne (12) | 0–5 | AJ Mézières (11) |
| 119. | AS Montigny-le-Bretonneux (10) | 1–2 | AS Soisy-sur-Seine (10) |
| 120. | Grigny FC (12) | 4–1 | Olympique Paris Espoir (12) |
| 121. | UF Créteil (11) | 1–3 | AJSC Nanterre (10) |
| 122. | FC Villiers-sur-Orge (13) | 0–3 | FC Bois-le-Roi (11) |
| 123. | FC Gournay (12) | 2–4 | AS Le Pin-Villevaude (10) |
| 124. | COSM Arcueil (10) | 0–5 | RC Arpajonnais (10) |

=== First round ===
These matches were played on 6 September 2020. (Note: US Roissy-en-Brie were awarded a bye to the second round, due to the withdrawal of USM Verneuil.)

First round results: Paris-Île-de-France
| Tie no | Home team (tier) | Score | Away team (tier) |
|---|---|---|---|
| 1. | AS La Plaine Victoire (12) | 3–0 (Note: Tie won by means of forfeit.) | Parmain AC (12) |
| 2. | Paris Université Club (10) | 3–1 | Saint-Michel Sports (11) |
| 3. | SC Briard (10) | 5–1 | FC Portugais US Ris-Orangis (11) |
| 4. | FC Saint-Germain-en-Laye (11) | 0–3 | Nicolaïte Chaillot Paris (10) |
| 5. | Olympique Mantes (13) | 0–2 | FC Deuil-Enghien (10) |
| 6. | FC Rambouillet Yvelines (10) | 2–4 | Saint-Cloud FC (9) |
| 7. | Lisses Foot 91 (13) | 4–1 | Entente Longueville Sainte-Colombe Saint-Loup-de-Naud Soisy-Bouy (10) |
| 8. | Bougival Foot (12) | 0–1 | Enfants de Passy Paris (13) |
| 9. | Garches Vaucresson FC (13) | 1–6 | Grigny FC (12) |
| 10. | Voisins FC (9) | 0–0 (4–2 p) (Note: Tie reversed from original draw.) | Breuillet FC (10) |
| 11. | LSO Colombes (9) | 0–1 | FC Romainville (10) |
| 12. | ES Plateau de Saclay (12) | 0–10 | Sèvres FC 92 (10) |
| 13. | Bussy Saint-Georges FC (11) | 5–2 | AS Victory (12) |
| 14. | JS Bondy (12) | 1–1 (4–5 p) | AS Saint-Mard (11) |
| 15. | ASA Montereau (9) | 4–3 | FC Boussy-Quincy (10) |
| 16. | Paris IFA (11) | 0–4 | RC Gonesse (10) |
| 17. | ES Saint-Germain-Laval (11) | 0–2 | FC Épinay Athletico (11) |
| 18. | AS Éragny FC (10) | 1–1 (4–2 p) | USA Clichy (10) |
| 19. | AS Mesnil-le-Roi (12) | 2–6 | CSM Île-Saint-Denis (13) |
| 20. | AJ Antony (12) | 0–0 (4–5 p) | FC Saint-Arnoult (13) |
| 21. | FC Moret-Veneux Sablons (10) | 0–1 | FC Lissois (10) |
| 22. | Cosmos Saint-Denis FC (10) | 0–4 | Sartrouville FC (9) |
| 23. | ES Guyancourt Saint-Quentin-en-Yvelines (10) | 2–0 | AAS Fresnes (10) |
| 24. | Neuilly-Plaisance Sports (11) | 0–0 (2–4 p) | Pays Créçois FC (9) |
| 25. | USL Presles (11) | 4–1 | FC Boissy (11) |
| 26. | Juziers FC (13) | 0–8 | Soisy-Andilly-Margency FC (9) |
| 27. | USM Gagny (10) | 3–2 | Bann'Zanmi (11) |
| 28. | US Vert-le-Grand (12) | 3–1 | Gatinais Val de Loing FC (10) |
| 29. | Courtry Foot (11) | 2–1 | Sevran FC (10) |
| 30. | FC Bois-le-Roi (11) | 1–3 | CS Mennecy (10) |
| 31. | Élan Chevilly-Larue (10) | 1–1 (7–6 p) | Paris Alésia FC (10) |
| 32. | RC Arpajonnais (10) | 4–1 | Villepreux FC (11) |
| 33. | FC Puiseux-Louvres (11) | 1–1 (4–3 p) | AS Paris 18è (12) |
| 34. | US Villeneuve Ablon (10) | 1–0 | Morsang-sur-Orge FC (10) |
| 35. | USF Trilport (10) | 7–1 | Montmagny SF (11) |
| 36. | ASF Le Perreux (9) | 4–4 (5–4 p) | FC Longjumeau (10) |
| 37. | AJ Mézières (11) | 1–1 (3–4 p) | SC Luth (12) |
| 38. | BO Attitude (14) | 5–4 | Gargenville Stade (9) |
| 39. | FC Varennes 77 (12) | 3–0 | ES Montgeron (11) |
| 40. | SO Houilles (10) | 2–2 (4–5 p) | FC Solitaires Paris Est (9) |
| 41. | Stade de l'Est Pavillonnais (9) | 6–0 | US Roissy-en-France (10) |
| 42. | Aigle Fertoise Boissy le Cutté (11) | 1–0 | FC Vallée 78 (9) |
| 43. | USM Malakoff (11) | 3–3 (9–10 p) | USO Bezons (10) |
| 44. | FC Émerainville (10) | 3–1 | Olympique Viarmes Asnières-sur-Oise (11) |
| 45. | CS Villetaneuse (11) | 1–0 | US Carrières-sur-Seine (11) |
| 46. | Saint-Thibault-des-Vignes FC (10) | 2–2 (5–3 p) | Fosses FU (11) |
| 47. | CSM Rosny-sur-Seine (10) | 2–2 (4–1 p) | FC Auvers-Ennery (10) |
| 48. | SC Dugny (10) | 3–1 | US Changis-Saint-Jean-Ussy (10) |
| 49. | AS Soisy-sur-Seine (10) | 10–0 | Portugais Académica Champigny (11) |
| 50. | UA Chantiers Paris (12) | 0–3 | AS Cheminots Ouest (13) |
| 51. | AS Val de l'Yerres (12) | 3–0 | Phare Sportive Zarzissien (12) |
| 52. | AS Paris (10) | 0–1 (Note: FC Groslay penalised for fielding a suspended player. AS Paris qualify.) | FC Groslay (9) |
| 53. | AS Itteville (11) | 3–0 | US Chaumes Guignes (11) |
| 54. | AJ Étampoise (11) | 7–0 | FC Champenois-Mammesien-Vernoucellois (11) |
| 55. | FC Villennes-Orgeval (11) | 8–0 | Mimosa Mada-Sport (12) |
| 56. | USM Bruyères-Bernes (13) | 0–3 | Maisons-Laffitte FC (12) |
| 57. | Entente Bagneaux Nemours Saint-Pierre (10) | 3–0 | FC Saint-Germain-Saintry-Saint-Pierre (11) |
| 58. | FC Saint Vrain (11) | 3–0 | ES Pays de Bière (11) |
| 59. | FC Brie Est (12) | 1–2 | Goutte d'Or FC (13) |
| 60. | Guyane FC Paris (13) | 1–0 | Coulommiers Brie (12) |
| 61. | Villeneuve AFC (12) | 4–0 | Neuilly-Plaisance FC (12) |
| 62. | AJSC Nanterre (10) | 3–0 | CSA Kremlin-Bicêtre (11) |
| 63. | FC Servon (11) | 2–2 (6–7 p) | La Camillienne Sports 12ème (10) |
| 64. | FC Jouy-le-Moutier (10) | 1–1 (4–5 p) | USBS Épône (9) |
| 65. | FC Coignières (10) | 2–0 | JSC Pitray-Olier (11) |
| 66. | FCM Vauréal (10) | 3–1 | Amicale Villeneuve-la-Garenne (9) |
| 67. | SC Épinay-sur-Orge (10) | 2–1 | AC Gentilly (11) |
| 68. | Flamboyants Villepinte (9) | 3–5 | US Lognes (9) |
| 69. | AO Buc Foot (12) | 0–3 | AS Angervilliers (12) |
| 70. | Enfants de la Goutte d'Or (11) | 0–0 (4–5 p) | Magny-le-Hongre FC (11) |
| 71. | CO Vigneux (10) | 2–2 (4–2 p) | US Ville d'Avray (9) |
| 72. | FC Brunoy (9) | 3–1 | FC Saint-Mande (10) |
| 73. | CS Cellois (13) | 1–0 | AF Paris 18 (13) |
| 74. | Marles AC (12) | 0–3 | AS Outre-Mer du Bois l'Abbé (12) |
| 75. | FC Cosmo 77 (11) | 5–0 | SO Rosny-sous-Bois (12) |
| 76. | Mantes-la-Ville FC (13) | 1–3 | FC Écouen (9) |
| 77. | Antony Football Evolution (13) | 3–0 | Vinsky FC (13) |
| 78. | US Yvelines (13) | 0–3 | FC Orsay-Bures (9) |
| 79. | Entente Pays du Limours (12) | 4–0 | AFL Gazeran (13) |
| 80. | Pierrefitte FC (12) | 2–4 | AC Mantais (13) |
| 81. | Brie FC (11) | 2–1 | SS Noiseau (12) |
| 82. | Marcoussis Nozay La-Ville-du-Bois FC (10) | 1–1 (4–2 p) | US Avonnaise (9) |
| 83. | ESC Paris 20 (10) | 1–0 | ES Vitry (9) |
| 84. | ASS Noiséenne (10) | 0–0 (4–3 p) | AS Menucourt (10) |
| 85. | ES Vauxoise (12) | 1–8 | US Persan (9) |
| 86. | US Ponthierry (10) | 0–4 | US Ris-Orangis (10) |
| 87. | ES Brie Nord (11) | 2–1 | AS Éclair de Puiseux (12) |
| 88. | FC Maurecourt (13) | 3–0 | FC Antillais Paris 19ème (13) |
| 89. | AS Fontenay-Saint-Père (13) | 2–6 | Entente Méry-Mériel Bessancourt (10) |
| 90. | Triel AC (12) | 0–3 | SFC Champagne 95 (10) |
| 91. | FC Coudraysien (13) | 1–3 | ASC Réunionnais de Sénart (12) |
| 92. | ASM Chambourcy (11) | 2–1 | Espérance Paris 19ème (10) |
| 93. | Amicale Bocage (12) | 0–3 | Milly Gâtinais FC (12) |
| 94. | USM Viroflay (12) | 3–4 | JS Paris (13) |
| 95. | CS Pouchet Paris XVII (13) | 0–3 | Bagnolet FC (11) |
| 96. | USM Les Clayes-sous-Bois (11) | 2–2 (3–4 p) | SS Voltaire Châtenay-Malabry (10) |
| 97. | FC Wissous (9) | 1–2 | US Verneuil-sur-Seine (10) |
| 98. | SFC Bailly Noisy-le-Roi (9) | 4–6 | TU Verrières-le-Buisson (9) |
| 99. | ES Saint-Pathus-Oissery (11) | 3–5 | JS Villiers-le-Bel (10) |
| 100. | US Ormesson-sur-Marne (10) | 0–4 | RCP Fontainebleau (9) |
| 101. | AS Champs-sur-Marne (10) | 2–1 | Championnet Sports Paris (11) |
| 102. | AS Breuilloise (11) | 0–3 | UF Clichois (9) |
| 103. | FC Fontenay-le-Fleury (12) | 0–5 | Argenteuil FC (9) |
| 104. | Goellycompans FC (10) | 1–2 | EFC Bobigny (11) |
| 105. | Magny FC 78 (12) | 0–3 | Salésienne de Paris (9) |
| 106. | AS Ollainville (13) | 0–3 | Héricy-Vulaines-Samoreau FC (11) |
| 107. | EFC Ecquevilly (12) | 1–5 | AS Meudon (9) |
| 108. | AFC Saint-Cyr (13) | 1–3 | FC Boissy-sous-Saint-Yon (13) |
| 109. | USD Ferrières-en-Brie (11) | 1–7 | CO Cachan (9) |
| 110. | CSM Bonneuil-sur-Marne (9) | 2–3 | Draveil FC (10) |
| 111. | FC Antillais de Vigneux-sur-Seine (13) | 0–3 | CA Combs-la-Ville (9) |
| 112. | AS Chelles (9) | 1–1 (3–4 p) | Aresport Stains 93 (10) |
| 113. | ES Villiers-sur-Marne (10) | 0–2 | FC Bourget (9) |
| 114. | AS Le Pin-Villevaude (10) | 3–2 | Paris SC (10) |
| 115. | FC Bonnières-sur-Seine Freneuse (12) | 0–3 | ACS Cormeillais (9) |
| 116. | AS Guerville-Arnouville (12) | 0–5 | FC Parisis (9) |
| 117. | UMS Pontault-Combault (9) | 1–2 | Olympique Montigny (9) |
| 118. | USC Lésigny (10) | 1–3 | AJ Limeil-Brévannes (9) |
| 119. | CO Savigny (9) | 4–0 | AS Bois d'Arcy (9) |
| 120. | AS Nanteuil-lès-Meaux (10) | 3–1 | US Mauloise (10) |
| 121. | ES Paris XIII (11) | 1–2 | FC Le Chesnay 78 (9) |
| 122. | CA Paris 14 (9) | 1–1 (3–1 p) | Savigny-le-Temple FC (10) |
| 123. | AS Lieusaint (10) | 1–1 (4–1 p) | SCM Châtillonnais (10) |

=== Second round ===
These matches were played on 13 September 2020.

Second round results: Paris-Île-de-France
| Tie no | Home team (tier) | Score | Away team (tier) |
|---|---|---|---|
| 1. | Évry FC (8) | 1–1 (4–1 p) (Note: Tie reversed from original draw) | ASC Réunionnais de Sénart (12) |
| 2. | FC Saint-Arnoult (13) | 5–0 | Entente Pays du Limours (12) |
| 3. | AC Mantais (13) | 2–5 | FCM Vauréal (10) |
| 4. | Draveil FC (10) | 0–1 | FC Plessis-Robinson (6) |
| 5. | FC Boissy-sous-Saint-Yon (13) | 3–4 | RCP Fontainebleau (9) |
| 6. | Nicolaïte Chaillot Paris (10) | 1–1 (4–2 p) | Épinay Académie (8) |
| 7. | ACS Cormeillais (9) | 0–1 | Olympique Noisy-le-Sec (6) |
| 8. | AJ Limeil-Brévannes (9) | 6–1 | Entente Bagneaux Nemours Saint-Pierre (10) |
| 9. | La Camillienne Sports 12ème (10) | 2–2 (3–4 p) | FC Courcouronnes (7) |
| 10. | USBS Épône (9) | 2–1 | ES Seizième (8) |
| 11. | AS Saint-Mard (11) | 0–5 | Champigny FC 94 (7) |
| 12. | Paray FC (8) | 1–0 | US Alfortville (7) |
| 13. | AS Cheminots Ouest (13) | 0–5 | ES Trappes (7) |
| 14. | Aigle Fertoise Boissy le Cutté (11) | 0–2 | CA Combs-la-Ville (9) |
| 15. | Lisses Foot 91 (13) | 1–2 | FC Varennes 77 (12) |
| 16. | RC Gonesse (10) | 0–3 | CSM Gennevilliers (7) |
| 17. | Olympique Montigny (9) | 1–3 | FC Les Lilas (6) |
| 18. | Pays Créçois FC (9) | 0–1 | Saint-Maur VGA (8) |
| 19. | Osny FC (8) | 0–1 | AS Chatou (6) |
| 20. | Magny-le-Hongre FC (11) | 1–5 | US Fontenay-sous-Bois (7) |
| 21. | Bagnolet FC (11) | 3–8 | FC Goussainville (8) |
| 22. | US Lognes (9) | 1–2 | FC Franconville (7) |
| 23. | Grigny FC (12) | 8–1 | JS Paris (13) |
| 24. | AS Paris (10) | 2–10 | FC Montfermeil (7) |
| 25. | Enfants de Passy Paris (13) | 3–1 | CS Cellois (13) |
| 26. | Saint-Cloud FC (9) | 2–0 | RFC Argenteuil (8) |
| 27. | Maisons-Laffitte FC (12) | 0–6 | AS Saint-Ouen-l'Aumône (6) |
| 28. | US Roissy-en-Brie (9) | 1–1 (1–3 p) | CSM Île-Saint-Denis (13) |
| 29. | EFC Bobigny (11) | 2–2 (4–2 p) | AS Outre-Mer du Bois l'Abbé (12) |
| 30. | FC Villennes-Orgeval (11) | 1–3 | SC Luth (12) |
| 31. | US Persan (9) | 1–2 | Neauphle-le-Château-Pontchartrain RC 78 (7) |
| 32. | Argenteuil FC (9) | 2–2 (8–7 p) | CA Paris 14 (9) |
| 33. | FC Maurecourt (13) | 3–6 | BO Attitude (14) |
| 34. | ES Nanterre (7) | 1–1 (2–4 p) | Cergy Pontoise FC (6) |
| 35. | Soisy-Andilly-Margency FC (9) | 2–2 (5–6 p) | ESC Paris 20 (10) |
| 36. | SC Briard (10) | 9–1 | AS Angervilliers (12) |
| 37. | UF Clichois (9) | 1–2 | US Villejuif (7) |
| 38. | Salésienne de Paris (9) | 2–1 | US Villeneuve Ablon (10) |
| 39. | Entente Méry-Mériel Bessancourt (10) | 0–4 | Mitry-Mory (7) |
| 40. | FC Deuil-Enghien (10) | 2–3 | ASS Noiséenne (10) |
| 41. | Sartrouville FC (9) | 1–2 | CSM Puteaux (8) |
| 42. | FC Bourget (9) | 2–6 | Meaux ADOM (7) |
| 43. | ASA Montereau (9) | 1–2 | FC Igny (7) |
| 44. | JS Villiers-le-Bel (10) | 2–2 (2–4 p) | CS Villetaneuse (11) |
| 45. | FC Le Chesnay 78 (9) | 1–2 | US Grigny (7) |
| 46. | CO Cachan (9) | 1–1 (3–4 p) | AJSC Nanterre (10) |
| 47. | USF Trilport (10) | 1–0 | ES Marly-la-Ville (8) |
| 48. | FC Maisons Alfort (8) | 3–0 | Claye-Souilly SF (6) |
| 49. | FC Romainville (10) | 3–1 | FC Émerainville (10) |
| 50. | SS Voltaire Châtenay-Malabry (10) | 0–2 | FC Morangis-Chilly (7) |
| 51. | Aresport Stains 93 (10) | 2–3 | FC Issy-les-Moulineaux (7) |
| 52. | FC Orsay-Bures (9) | 1–4 | CA Paris-Charenton (8) |
| 53. | FC Puiseux-Louvres (11) | 3–0 | Courtry Foot (11) |
| 54. | AS Meudon (9) | 3–3 (4–2 p) | US Rungis (7) |
| 55. | FC Épinay Athletico (11) | 1–3 | US Sénart-Moissy (6) |
| 56. | SFC Champagne 95 (10) | 10–0 | ES Brie Nord (11) |
| 57. | Sèvres FC 92 (10) | 1–0 | ASF Le Perreux (9) |
| 58. | Brie FC (11) | 1–2 | SFC Neuilly-sur-Marne (7) |
| 59. | Milly Gâtinais FC (12) | 2–5 | COM Bagneux (8) |
| 60. | FC Solitaires Paris Est (9) | 3–2 | FC Ozoir-la-Ferrière 77 (7) |
| 61. | US Verneuil-sur-Seine (10) | 0–1 | Olympique Adamois (7) |
| 62. | Villeneuve AFC (12) | 0–1 | FC Lissois (10) |
| 63. | CS Mennecy (10) | 1–1 (4–5 p) | UJA Maccabi Paris Métropole (8) |
| 64. | FC Massy 91 (8) | 3–1 | AS Maurepas (8) |
| 65. | CSM Rosny-sur-Seine (10) | 1–3 | Saint-Brice FC (6) |
| 66. | Bussy Saint-Georges FC (11) | 0–5 | Stade de l'Est Pavillonnais (9) |
| 67. | AS La Plaine Victoire (12) | 3–2 | Guyane FC Paris (13) |
| 68. | US Vert-le-Grand (12) | 1–4 | FC Melun (7) |
| 69. | ES Guyancourt Saint-Quentin-en-Yvelines (10) | 0–2 | Val Yerres Crosne AF (7) |
| 70. | AS Soisy-sur-Seine (10) | 0–4 | Montrouge FC 92 (6) |
| 71. | CO Savigny (9) | 0–2 | JS Suresnes (7) |
| 72. | CO Vigneux (10) | 1–2 | Villemomble Sports (6) |
| 73. | FC Parisis (9) | 3–3 (4–2 p) | US Marly-le-Roi (8) |
| 74. | Saint-Thibault-des-Vignes FC (10) | 1–1 (4–5 p) | Espérance Aulnay (6) |
| 75. | AS Éragny FC (10) | 2–6 | ALJ Limay (8) |
| 76. | US Ris-Orangis (10) | 1–1 (1–3 p) | Athletic Club de Boulogne-Billancourt (6) |
| 77. | Marcoussis Nozay La-Ville-du-Bois FC (10) | 1–5 | FC Rueil Malmaison (8) |
| 78. | SC Épinay-sur-Orge (10) | 1–7 | Courbevoie Sports (7) |
| 79. | US Hardricourt (8) | 1–1 (2–3 p) | AF Garenne-Colombes (6) |
| 80. | AS Le Pin-Villevaude (10) | 0–4 | CSL Aulnay (8) |
| 81. | FC Saint Vrain (11) | 3–5 | Le Mée Sports (6) |
| 82. | AS Itteville (11) | 0–2 | ASA Issy (7) |
| 83. | FC Coignières (10) | 0–9 | ES Viry-Châtillon (6) |
| 84. | SC Dugny (10) | 2–7 | ES Parisienne (7) |
| 85. | FC Brunoy (9) | 0–6 | CO Vincennes (6) |
| 86. | AS Ermont (8) | 1–1 (5–3 p) | US Torcy (6) |
| 87. | USM Gagny (10) | 0–2 | FCM Garges-lès-Gonesse (8) |
| 88. | USL Presles (11) | 0–2 | Noisy-le-Grand FC (6) |
| 89. | AS Champs-sur-Marne (10) | 0–4 | ASC La Courneuve (8) |
| 90. | ASM Chambourcy (11) | 0–3 | FC Saint-Leu (6) |
| 91. | US Vaires-sur-Marne (8) | 0–1 | Montreuil FC (7) |
| 92. | Élan Chevilly-Larue (10) | 0–1 | AC Paris 15 (7) |
| 93. | AJ Étampoise (11) | 1–5 | ES Cesson Vert Saint-Denis (7) |
| 94. | FC Cosmo 77 (11) | 1–3 | Saint-Denis US (6) |
| 95. | Val d'Europe FC (7) | 2–0 | ES Stains (8) |
| 96. | Voisins FC (9) | 3–3 (3–4 p) | Tremplin Foot (8) |
| 97. | TU Verrières-le-Buisson (9) | 0–2 | Sucy FC (6) |
| 98. | Paris Université Club (10) | 0–3 | FC Livry-Gargan (7) |
| 99. | SC Gretz-Tournan (8) | 1–1 (3–1 p) | AS Choisy-le-Roi (7) |
| 100. | AS Val de l'Yerres (12) | 0–5 | CA Vitry (6) |
| 101. | US Palaiseau (8) | 0–1 | AC Houilles (7) |
| 102. | AS Nanteuil-lès-Meaux (10) | 0–4 | OFC Pantin (8) |
| 103. | Cosmo Taverny (7) | 2–0 | USM Villeparisis (8) |
| 104. | Val de France Foot (8) | 2–2 (3–4 p) | AAS Sarcelles (7) |
| 105. | Héricy-Vulaines-Samoreau FC (11) | 1–7 | FC Étampes (8) |
| 106. | AS Lieusaint (10) | 1–1 (3–2 p) | RC Arpajonnais (10) |
| 107. | FC Écouen (9) | 2–3 | ES Colombienne (6) |
| 108. | Antony Football Evolution (13) | 4–0 | Goutte d'Or FC (13) |
| 109. | USO Bezons (10) | 0–1 | Conflans FC (6) |

=== Third round ===
These matches were played on 19 and 20 September 2020.

Third round results: Paris-Île-de-France
| Tie no | Home team (tier) | Score | Away team (tier) |
|---|---|---|---|
| 1. | FC Montfermeil (7) | 4–1 | FC Maisons Alfort (8) |
| 2. | CSM Puteaux (8) | 1–2 | FC Étampes (8) |
| 3. | FCM Vauréal (10) | 0–3 | Val d'Europe FC (7) |
| 4. | FC Plessis-Robinson (6) | 2–1 | ES Cesson Vert Saint-Denis (7) |
| 5. | ES Parisienne (7) | 1–0 | CS Brétigny (5) |
| 6. | SC Gretz-Tournan (8) | 3–2 | Salésienne de Paris (9) |
| 7. | AC Houilles (7) | 1–1 (4–3 p) | AS Ermont (8) |
| 8. | Sèvres FC 92 (10) | 0–4 | US Ivry (5) |
| 9. | SFC Champagne 95 (10) | 1–5 | Racing Club de France Football (5) |
| 10. | AS La Plaine Victoire (12) | 2–12 | ES Colombienne (6) |
| 11. | FCM Garges-lès-Gonesse (8) | 1–1 (5–6 p) | CA Vitry (6) |
| 12. | AS Saint-Ouen-l'Aumône (6) | 2–0 | AC Paris 15 (7) |
| 13. | Nicolaïte Chaillot Paris (10) | 0–3 | AS Chatou (6) |
| 14. | SFC Neuilly-sur-Marne (7) | 1–1 (3–4 p) | OFC Les Mureaux (5) |
| 15. | Saint-Brice FC (6) | 3–1 (Note: Tie reversed from original draw.) | ESC Paris 20 (10) |
| 16. | USF Trilport (10) | 2–0 | US Fontenay-sous-Bois (7) |
| 17. | FC Livry-Gargan (7) | 0–0 (4–2 p) | Sucy FC (6) |
| 18. | US Sénart-Moissy (6) | 0–0 (4–2 p) | FC Les Lilas (6) |
| 19. | Meaux ADOM (7) | 4–3 | CSM Gennevilliers (7) |
| 20. | Mitry-Mory (7) | 0–0 (5–4 p) | Saint-Denis US (6) |
| 21. | ES Trappes (7) | 6–0 | CSM Île-Saint-Denis (13) |
| 22. | Olympique Adamois (7) | 2–1 | Villemomble Sports (6) |
| 23. | FC Romainville (10) | 0–3 | CO Vincennes (6) |
| 24. | BO Attitude (14) | 0–12 | Cergy Pontoise FC (6) |
| 25. | FC Franconville (7) | 0–2 | Montrouge FC 92 (6) |
| 26. | Argenteuil FC (9) | 1–2 | FCM Aubervilliers (5) |
| 27. | FC Puiseux-Louvres (11) | 1–5 | US Villejuif (7) |
| 28. | SC Luth (12) | 1–3 | FC Courcouronnes (7) |
| 29. | ALJ Limay (8) | 0–1 | ESA Linas-Montlhéry (5) |
| 30. | AJSC Nanterre (10) | 3–2 | EFC Bobigny (11) |
| 31. | AS Meudon (9) | 0–2 | CO Les Ulis (5) |
| 32. | Enfants de Passy Paris (13) | 2–5 | CS Villetaneuse (11) |
| 33. | Athletic Club de Boulogne-Billancourt (6) | 0–0 (5–3 p) | FC Melun (7) |
| 34. | FC Morangis-Chilly (7) | 2–0 | ASC La Courneuve (8) |
| 35. | FC Solitaires Paris Est (9) | 1–3 | FC Massy 91 (8) |
| 36. | Tremplin Foot (8) | 3–0 | CA Combs-la-Ville (9) |
| 37. | FC Rueil Malmaison (8) | 2–3 | Montreuil FC (7) |
| 38. | Courbevoie Sports (7) | 3–4 | FC Saint-Leu (6) |
| 39. | FC Varennes 77 (12) | 0–4 | Paray FC (8) |
| 40. | Saint-Cloud FC (9) | 2–2 (3–1 p) | Olympique Noisy-le-Sec (6) |
| 41. | FC Goussainville (8) | 3–3 (5–6 p) | Conflans FC (6) |
| 42. | JS Suresnes (7) | 3–0 | Cosmo Taverny (7) |
| 43. | SC Briard (10) | 1–2 | CSL Aulnay (8) |
| 44. | FC Issy-les-Moulineaux (7) | 5–2 | Champigny FC 94 (7) |
| 45. | USBS Épône (9) | 2–1 | ASA Issy (7) |
| 46. | Val Yerres Crosne AF (7) | 2–1 | CS Meaux (5) |
| 47. | Saint-Maur VGA (8) | 0–0 (4–2 p) | FC Mantois 78 (5) |
| 48. | Neauphle-le-Château-Pontchartrain RC 78 (7) | 1–3 | JA Drancy (5) |
| 49. | AJ Limeil-Brévannes (9) | 2–1 | US Grigny (7) |
| 50. | FC Parisis (9) | 2–2 (4–1 p) | Blanc-Mesnil SF (5) |
| 51. | RCP Fontainebleau (9) | 2–4 | FC Lissois (10) |
| 52. | CA Paris-Charenton (8) | 1–0 | OFC Pantin (8) |
| 53. | FC Saint-Arnoult (13) | 1–4 | Grigny FC (12) |
| 54. | AAS Sarcelles (7) | 1–2 | Noisy-le-Grand FC (6) |
| 55. | COM Bagneux (8) | 1–4 | Le Mée Sports (6) |
| 56. | Antony Football Evolution (13) | 1–4 | ASS Noiséenne (10) |
| 57. | Stade de l'Est Pavillonnais (9) | 1–0 | AS Lieusaint (10) |
| 58. | AF Garenne-Colombes (6) | 3–1 | FC Igny (7) |
| 59. | UJA Maccabi Paris Métropole (8) | 1–1 (4–2 p) | ES Viry-Châtillon (6) |
| 60. | Évry FC (8) | 2–3 | Espérance Aulnay (6) |

=== Fourth round ===
These matches were played on 3 and 4 October 2020, with one postponed until 7 October 2020.

Fourth round results: Paris-Île-de-France
| Tie no | Home team (tier) | Score | Away team (tier) |
|---|---|---|---|
| 1. | Grigny FC (12) | 0–4 | Espérance Aulnay (6) |
| 2. | AJ Limeil-Brévannes (9) | 1–3 | US Villejuif (7) |
| 3. | Saint-Maur VGA (8) | 2–2 (4–3 p) | AS Chatou (6) |
| 4. | FC Saint-Leu (6) | 0–0 (4–5 p) | L'Entente SSG (4) |
| 5. | AC Houilles (7) | 1–1 (4–3 p) | Paris 13 Atletico (4) |
| 6. | FC Montfermeil (7) | 1–2 | FC Fleury 91 (4) |
| 7. | Olympique Adamois (7) | 0–0 (5–6 p) | Meaux ADOM (7) |
| 8. | JS Suresnes (7) | 3–1 (Note: Tie reversed from original draw.) | Saint-Cloud FC (9) |
| 9. | Val Yerres Crosne AF (7) | 0–4 | JA Drancy (5) |
| 10. | FC Courcouronnes (7) | 4–0 | FC Morangis-Chilly (7) |
| 11. | ASS Noiséenne (10) | 3–1 | AJSC Nanterre (10) |
| 12. | Noisy-le-Grand FC (6) | 0–2 | Football Club 93 Bobigny-Bagnolet-Gagny (4) |
| 13. | FC Plessis-Robinson (6) | 2–0 | FC Versailles 78 (4) |
| 14. | Val d'Europe FC (7) | 0–5 | ESA Linas-Montlhéry (5) |
| 15. | Saint-Brice FC (6) | 1–0 | AS Poissy (4) |
| 16. | Tremplin Foot (8) | 0–3 | FC Issy-les-Moulineaux (7) |
| 17. | US Ivry (5) | 3–2 | OFC Les Mureaux (5) |
| 18. | CA Paris-Charenton (8) | 1–2 | ES Colombienne (6) |
| 19. | CS Villetaneuse (11) | 1–3 | Montrouge FC 92 (6) |
| 20. | USBS Épône (9) | 0–1 | Sainte-Geneviève Sports (4) |
| 21. | FC Lissois (10) | 0–3 | CO Les Ulis (5) |
| 22. | FC Parisis (9) | 0–0 (4–2 p) | Stade de l'Est Pavillonnais (9) |
| 23. | FC Massy 91 (8) | 1–4 | CA Vitry (6) |
| 24. | SC Gretz-Tournan (8) | 0–2 | Conflans FC (6) |
| 25. | USF Trilport (10) | 0–2 | Paray FC (8) |
| 26. | ES Parisienne (7) | 2–1 | AS Saint-Ouen-l'Aumône (6) |
| 27. | Mitry-Mory (7) | 1–1 (14–13 p) | Racing Club de France Football (5) |
| 28. | CO Vincennes (6) | 3–3 (5–3 p) | FCM Aubervilliers (5) |
| 29. | Le Mée Sports (6) | 1–1 (4–2 p) | Athletic Club de Boulogne-Billancourt (6) |
| 30. | AF Garenne-Colombes (6) | 2–1 | ES Trappes (7) |
| 31. | Cergy Pontoise FC (6) | 5–1 | Montreuil FC (7) |
| 32. | CSL Aulnay (8) | 0–1 | US Lusitanos Saint-Maur (4) |
| 33. | UJA Maccabi Paris Métropole (8) | 2–2 (2–3 p) | US Sénart-Moissy (6) |
| 34. | FC Étampes (8) | 0–0 (2–4 p) | FC Livry-Gargan (7) |

=== Fifth round ===
These matches were played on 17 and 18 October 2020, with one postponed until 30 January 2021.

Fifth round results: Paris-Île-de-France
| Tie no | Home team (tier) | Score | Away team (tier) |
|---|---|---|---|
| 1. | Conflans FC (6) | 2–2 (3–1 p) | Espérance Aulnay (6) |
| 2. | JS Suresnes (7) | 0–1 | US Créteil-Lusitanos (3) |
| 3. | AC Houilles (7) | 1–1 (1–3 p) | Football Club 93 Bobigny-Bagnolet-Gagny (4) |
| 4. | Paray FC (8) | 0–2 | Sainte-Geneviève Sports (4) |
| 5. | CO Les Ulis (5) | 0–2 | Saint-Brice FC (6) |
| 6. | AF Garenne-Colombes (6) | 1–5 | FC Fleury 91 (4) |
| 7. | FC Livry-Gargan (7) | 0–2 | Saint-Maur VGA (8) |
| 8. | US Sénart-Moissy (6) | 0–0 (6–5 p) | CO Vincennes (6) |
| 9. | L'Entente SSG (4) | 1–3 | US Lusitanos Saint-Maur (4) |
| 10. | ES Colombienne (6) | 2–2 (3–5 p) | ESA Linas-Montlhéry (5) |
| 11. | Montrouge FC 92 (6) | 4–0 | FC Plessis-Robinson (6) |
| 12. | Mitry-Mory (7) | 1–0 | Cergy Pontoise FC (6) |
| 13. | Le Mée Sports (6) | 1–4 | Red Star FC (3) |
| 14. | CA Vitry (6) | 1–0 | FC Issy-les-Moulineaux (7) |
| 15. | US Villejuif (7) | 5–0 | FC Courcouronnes (7) |
| 16. | FC Parisis (9) | 1–1 (5–4 p) | ES Parisienne (7) |
| 17. | ASS Noiséenne (10) | 1–11 | US Ivry (5) |
| 18. | Meaux ADOM (7) | 1–1 (3–4 p) | JA Drancy (5) |

=== Sixth round ===
These matches were played on 30 and 31 January 2021, with one postponed until 6 February 2021.

Sixth round results: Paris-Île-de-France
| Tie no | Home team (tier) | Score | Away team (tier) |
|---|---|---|---|
| 1. | Sainte-Geneviève Sports (4) | 1–2 | US Créteil-Lusitanos (3) |
| 2. | US Villejuif (7) | 1–2 | US Sénart-Moissy (6) |
| 3. | FC Parisis (9) | 2–3 | JA Drancy (5) |
| 4. | Saint-Brice FC (6) | 4–0 | Montrouge FC 92 (6) |
| 5. | Conflans FC (6) | 2–0 (Note: Conflans FC penalised for fielding a suspended player. CA Vitry qualify.) | CA Vitry (6) |
| 6. | Saint-Maur VGA (8) | 0–2 | Football Club 93 Bobigny-Bagnolet-Gagny (4) |
| 7. | US Ivry (5) | 0–2 | Red Star FC (3) |
| 8. | ESA Linas-Montlhéry (5) | 0–1 | US Lusitanos Saint-Maur (4) |
| 9. | Mitry-Mory (7) | 0–2 | FC Fleury 91 (4) |
