= 2019–20 Coupe de France preliminary rounds, Paris-Île-de-France =

The 2019–20 Coupe de France preliminary rounds, Paris-Île-de-France was the qualifying competition to decide which teams from the leagues of the Paris-Île-de-France region of France took part in the main competition from the seventh round.

A total of eleven teams qualified from the Paris-Île-de-France preliminary rounds. In 2018–19, Noisy-le-Grand FC progressed furthest in the main competition, reaching the round of 32 before losing to SC Bastia.

== Schedule ==
The first two rounds of the qualifying competition took place during the 2018–19 season. The first round consisted of the clubs in the district leagues (level 9 and below of the French league system). 360 teams entered at this stage, and the draw was made on 28 March 2019. An additional 87 teams from the regional league (levels 6 to 8) entered at the second round stage, with one winner from round 1 (FC Romainville) being given a bye to round three. The draw was published on 2 May 2019 with matches taking place in June.

The third round draw was made at the end of August 2019, with the remaining teams from Championnat National 3 (tier 5) joining the competition. 68 ties were scheduled, with seven second round winners given byes to the fourth round (UJA Maccabi Paris Métropole, AC Houilles, AS Ballainvilliers, Cergy Pontoise FC, FC Morangis-Chilly, OFC Pantin, US Mauloise).

The fourth round draw was made on 17 September 2019, with the nine Championnat National 2 teams entering, and 42 ties drawn. The fifth round draw was made on 1 October 2019, with the two Championnat National teams entering, and 22 ties drawn.

The sixth round draw was made on 15 October 2019, with 11 ties drawn.

=== First round ===
These matches were played between 18 April and 5 May 2019, with one tie replayed on 30 May 2019. Tiers shown reflect the 2018–19 season.

First round results: Paris-Île-de-France
Tie no	Home team (tier)	Score	Away team (tier)
1.	AS Menucourt (10)	4–2	Gargenville Stade (9)
2.	FC Athis-Mons (10)	0–5	FC Le Chesnay 78 (9)
3.	FC St Mande (10)	1–0	FC Cosmo 77 (10)
4.	AJ Antony (11)	3–2	Marcoussis Nozay La-Ville-du-Bois FC (10)
5.	AS Champs-sur-Marne (9)	0–1	St Maur VGA (9)
6.	ES Stains (10)	2–0	ES Vitry (9)
7.	USA Clichy (10)	2–1 (Note: Tie reversed from original draw.)	USM Les Clayes-sous-Bois (10)
8.	US Chanteloup-les-Vignes (10)	1–2	Olympique Montigny (9)
9.	Élan Chevilly-Larue (11)	5–1	LSO Colombes (9)
10.	US Quincy-Voisins FC (10)	0–1	Aresport Stains 93 (11)
11.	FC Bonnières-sur-Seine Freneuse (11)	2–3	FC Jouy-le-Moutier (9)
12.	AS Beauchamp (10)	2–1	CSM Rosny-sur-Seine (11)
13.	USM Viroflay (13)	1–9	St Cloud FC (9)
14.	Goellycompans FC (10)	5–5 (4–5 p)	Enfants de la Goutte d'Or (10)
15.	Aigle Fertoise Boissy le Cutté (11)	4–1	Turcs FC Montereau (12)
16.	Panamicaine FC (14)	1–3	FC Boissy (10)
17.	ASL Janville Lardy (11)	6–6 (5–3 p)	CA Combs-la-Ville (10)
18.	AJSC Nanterre (10)	1–5	TU Verrières-le-Buisson (9)
19.	FC Chaville (11)	4–2	US Jouy-en-Josas (10)
20.	AS Outre-Mer du Bois l'Abbé (11)	0–1	Stade Vanve (9)
21.	FC Boussy-Quincy (10)	4–2	FC Nandy (9)
22.	FC Bry (9)	1–2	USC Lésigny (10)
23.	ES Jeunes Stade (11)	3–0 (Note: Champs FC did not show. ES Jeunes Stade qualify.)	Champs FC (12)
24.	AFC St Cyr (12)	1–4	Grigny FC (13)
25.	Champcueil FC (13)	2–3	Olympique Paris 15 (14)
26.	Flamboyants Villepinte (10)	1–0	AS Chelles (9)
27.	FC Beynes (14)	0–3 (Note: FC Beynes forfeited their place in the league, so forfeit their right to participate in the cup. AS Chars qualify.)	AS Chars (12)
28.	FC Servon (12)	1–3	AC Gentilly (11)
29.	Bouffemont ACF (12)	0–2	UF Clichois (9)
30.	SO Vertois (13)	1–0 (Note: AO Buc Foot penalised for fielding too many players transferred outside the agreed window. SO Vertois qualify. Original scoreline was 1–3.)	AO Buc Foot (12)
31.	Morsang-sur-Orge FC (11)	3–0 (Note: Vaux-le-Pénil La Rochette FC forfeited their place in the league, so forfeit their right to participate in the cup. Morsang-sur-Orge FC qualify.)	Vaux-le-Pénil La Rochette FC (9)
32.	AS Lieusaint (10)	6–2	Phare Sportive Zarzissien (11)
33.	FC Porcheville (11)	1–3	AS Éragny FC (10)
34.	Vernolitain Stade (13)	1–3	OC Gif Section Foot (10)
35.	FC St Germain-en-Laye (11)	15–1	JS Pontoisienne (11)
36.	FC Puiseux-Louvres (12)	3–0 (Note: Bussy St Georges FC forfeited their place in the league, so forfeit their right to participate in the cup. FC Puiseux-Louvres qualify.)	Bussy St Georges FC (10)
37.	US Vert-le-Grand (12)	5–5 (4–1 p)	Courtry Foot (10)
38.	AFC Île St Denis (11)	1–5	JS Villiers-le-Bel (11)
39.	FC Villiers-sur-Orge (13)	0–3	Benfica Argoselo Sports Paris (14)
40.	Pays Créçois FC (10)	3–0	Neuilly-Plaisance Sports (11)
41.	AS Versailles Jussieu (13)	3–0 (Note: Tie won through forfeit.)	AS Grenelle (14)
42.	FC Domont (11)	2–4	Sevran FC (9)
43.	US Ponthierry (10)	0–2	US Ormesson-sur-Marne (10)
44.	FC Andrésy (12)	2–2 (4–5 p)	GAFE Plessis-Bouchard (11)
45.	Draveil FC (10)	1–0 (a.e.t.)	SS Voltaire Châtenay-Malabry (11)
46.	AS Mesnil-le-Roi (12)	1–5 (a.e.t.)	CSM Eaubonne (12)
47.	AS Bourg-la-Reine (13)	3–2 (a.e.t.)	SFC Bailly Noisy-le-Roi (10)
48.	AC Orly (12)	4–3	ES Saint-Germain-Laval (11)
49.	ES Guyancourt St Quentin-en-Yvelines (9)	2–1 (a.e.t.)	FC Longjumeau (10)
50.	Bondoufle AC (12)	4–2	Ablis FC Sud 78 (13)
51.	UJ Boissy (12)	0–3	AS Nanteuil-lès-Meaux (11)
52.	Paris SC (11)	1–2	Fontenay-en-Parisis FC (11)
53.	CS Assyro-Chaldéens Sarcelles (12)	3–2	USM Audonienne (10)
54.	FC Vallée 78 (10)	2–2 (6–5 p)	SCM Châtillonnais (9)
55.	ESM Thillay-Vaudherland (12)	1–2	Paris IFA (12)
56.	FC Esperanto (11)	1–4	USF Trilport (10)
57.	AS Montigny-le-Bretonneux (10)	4–0	USO Bezons (11)
58.	Argenteuil FC (10)	6–2	OFC Couronnes (10)
59.	FC Nogent-sur-Marne (10)	11–0	AS Éclair de Puiseux (11)
60.	Viking Club de Paris (11)	5–4	Magny-le-Hongre FC (10)
61.	Milly Gâtinais FC (11)	3–0	Entente Longueville Ste Colombe St Loup-de-Naud Soisy-Bouy (10)
62.	Portugais Pontault-Combault (10)	0–2	FC St Germain-Saintry-St Pierre (10)
63.	OSC Élancourt (11)	4–2	US Ville d'Avray (11)
64.	St Michel Sports (11)	5–3	FC Rambouillet Yvelines (10)
65.	ES Vauxoise (13)	– (Note: Match stopped, to be replayed.)	Amicale Villeneuve-la-Garenne (9)
66.	US Ézanville-Écouen (10)	1–4	US Mauloise (10)
67.	USD Ferrières-en-Brie (11)	2–1	Bann'Zanmi (12)
68.	Magny FC 78 (13)	0–1	ASC Réunionnais de Sénart (12)
69.	Breuillet FC (10)	1–2 (a.e.t.)	FC Région Houdanaise (10)
70.	AC Villenoy (11)	4–0	OC Ivry (12)
71.	Garches Vaucresson FC (14)	3–0 (Note: UF Créteil did not show. Garches Vaucresson FC qualify.)	UF Créteil (11)
72.	AAS Fresnes (11)	4–2	Voisins FC (10)
73.	US Lagny Messagers (11)	0–0 (4–1 p)	Thiais FC (10)
74.	US Yvelines (12)	2–0	ES Boissy-L'Allerie (12)
75.	Enfants de Gennevilliers (14)	2–6	US Montsoult-Baillet-Maffliers (12)
76.	ES Villabé (10)	2–6 (a.e.t.)	AJ Limeil-Brévannes (10)
77.	AS Fontenay-le-Fleury (12)	1–2	AJ Étampoise (12)
78.	Villebon SF (10)	3–2	Mimosa Mada-Sport (11)
79.	ASM Ferté-sous-Jouarre (10)	2–1	ASF Le Perreux (9)
80.	FC Aulnay (10)	2–1	FC Émerainville (10)
81.	FC Mormant (12)	0–2	FC Portugais US Ris-Orangis (11)
82.	ASC Velizy (10)	5–3	AS Sud Essonne (11)
83.	Drancy FC (12)	4–5 (a.e.t.)	US Persan (9)
84.	Parmain AC (12)	0–2	USC Mantes (13)
85.	RC Gonesse (10)	0–2	ES Brie Nord (11)
86.	FC Magnanville (11)	3–2 (a.e.t.)	FCM Vauréal (11)
87.	FC Chevry Cossigny 77 (10)	1–1 (4–5 p)	AS Soisy-sur-Seine (9)
88.	USM Gagny (11)	6–6 (4–1 p)	AS Le Pin-Villevaude (10)
89.	JS Bondy (12)	5–4 (a.e.t.)	UMS Pontault-Combault (9)
90.	Entente Pays du Limours (13)	– (Note: Match did not take place due to the late arrival of FC La Verrière. FC La Verrière penalised, Entente Pays du Limours qualify.)	FC La Verrière (14)
91.	CA Lizéen (12)	1–2 (a.e.t.)	L'EED FC (13)
92.	CSA Kremlin-Bicêtre (11)	2–1	Ménilmontant FC 1871 (12)
93.	ACS Cormeillais (9)	4–1	AS Paris (10)
94.	ES Plateau de Saclay (13)	1–2	Olympique Neuilly (9)
95.	Paris Université Club (9)	2–4	SC Gretz-Tournan (10)
96.	ASPTT Villecresnes (12)	1–4	SC Luth (13)
97.	ES Petit Anges Paris (12)	7–2	AS Renaissance (12)
98.	Triel AC (12)	1–3	SFC Champagne 95 (10)
99.	ASS Noiséenne (12)	7–2	FC Groslay (9)
100.	USM Bruyères-Bernes (11)	4–2	FC Portugais Plessis-Placy (11)
101.	AS Guerville-Arnouville (13)	2–4	AS Neuville-sur-Oise (10)
102.	US Montesson (9)	1–1 (8–7 p)	FCM Garges-lès-Gonesse (9)
103.	FC Massy 91 (10)	1–2	ES Seizième (9)
104.	ES Villiers-sur-Marne (11)	1–2	FC Solitaires Paris Est (9)
105.	FC Wissous (11)	7–2	Paris Alésia FC (10)
106.	AS Ermont (10)	3–1	FC Bourget (9)
107.	ASL Mesnil St Denis (14)	0–4	RC Arpajonnais (10)
108.	Olympique Viarmes Asnières-sur-Oise (11)	5–1	AS Issou (13)
109.	Soisy-Andilly-Margency FC (11)	0–1	ASC La Courneuve (9)
110.	Fosses FU (11)	2–3	Val de France Foot (9)
111.	FC Antillais de Vigneux-sur-Seine (13)	0–4	Sèvres FC 92 (10)
112.	AS Ballainvilliers (11)	3–0 (Note: Lut's Foot Loisirs did not show. AS Ballainvilliers qualify.)	Lut's Foot Loisirs (12)
113.	AS St Mard (11)	6–3	AS Victory (12)
114.	FC Villennes-Orgeval (11)	0–1	CS Pouchet Paris XVII (12)
115.	EFC Bobigny (13)	2–3	La Camillienne Sports 12ème (10)
116.	St Thibault-des-Vignes FC (10)	1–0	Stade de l'Est Pavillonnais (9)
117.	CA Romainville (11)	3–0	Brie FC (11)
118.	AS Ollainville (12)	0–5	FO Plaisirois (9)
119.	FC Asnières (11)	3–1	ESC Paris 20 (12)
120.	ES Jouy-Yvron (11)	1–5	US Ris-Orangis (10)
121.	Les Petits Pains (13)	0–3	FC Coignières (11)
122.	Entente Méry-Mériel Bessancourt (10)	6–1	USBS Épône (10)
123.	Enfants de Passy Paris (14)	4–5	Entraide Franco Egéenne (12)
124.	FA Le Raincy (10)	2–1	US Villeneuve Ablon (10)
125.	AS Cheminots Ouest (14)	0–3	AS Carrières Grésillons (9)
126.	Mantes-la-Ville FC (14)	4–5 (a.e.t.)	FC Montmorency (11)
127.	AS Courdimanche (11)	3–2	AS Paris 18è (11)
128.	Etoiles d'Auber (13)	1–6	FC Deuil-Enghien (10)
129.	US Boissise-Pringy-Orgenoy (11)	4–1	Portugais Académica Champigny (12)
130.	Entente Beaumont Mours (12)	1–11	US Carrières-sur-Seine (10)
131.	Parisud FC (14)	0–3	AS Bruyères (11)
132.	CS Mennecy (10)	3–1 (a.e.t.)	FC Moret-Veneux Sablons (11)
133.	ES Frettoise (11)	0–5	US Hardricourt (9)
134.	FC Guignes (12)	0–2	CO Cachan (9)
135.	Championnet Sports Paris (13)	4–1	COSM Arcueil (11)
136.	AJ Mézières (12)	0–4 (a.e.t.)	FC Orsay-Bures (10)
137.	FC St Vrain (12)	5–1	Amicale Bocage (12)
138.	Cosmos St Denis FC (10)	1–4	AS Ultra Marine Paris (10)
139.	SC Épinay-sur-Orge (10)	3–2	FC Intercommunal Loing (9)
140.	FC Auvers-Ennery (11)	0–1	CS Berbère (11)
141.	AS Breuilloise (12)	3–0	Sport Rue Prévention (13)
142.	USM Malakoff (10)	3–0	Savigny-le-Temple FC (10)
143.	FC Vaujours (11)	3–0 (a.e.t.)	AS Fontenay-Trésigny (11)
144.	Villepreux FC (11)	3–5 (a.e.t.)	AS Meudon (11)
145.	JSC Pitray-Olier (10)	7–0	FC Plateau Bréval Longnes (11)
146.	ASM Chambourcy (11)	3–2	CS Villetaneuse (11)
147.	FC Lissois (10)	3–0	FC Bois-le-Roi (11)
148.	Antony Football Evolution (14)	0–3	AS Bois d'Arcy (10)
149.	Pierrefitte FC (11)	0–1	FC Écouen (9)
150.	RCP Fontainebleau (9)	2–3 (a.e.t.)	CO Savigny (9)
151.	SO Houilles (11)	1–1 (3–4 p)	FC Bonneuil-en-France (11)
152.	US Verneuil-sur-Seine (10)	4–0	CSM Clamart Foot (10)
153.	Espérance Paris 19ème (10)	3–2	US Roissy-en-France (10)
154.	AS Arnouville (11)	3–0 (Note: Villeneuve-St Georges FC forfeited their place in the league, so forfeit their right to participate in the cup. AS Arnouville qualify.)	Villeneuve-St Georges FC (12)
155.	AS Fontenay-St Père (14)	2–3	Arronville FC (12)
156.	US Changis-St Jean-Ussy (11)	2–2 (6–7 p)	ESC XVème (13)
157.	CS Villeroy (12)	0–3	FC Romainville (9)
158.	FS Esbly (11)	4–1	Noyers FC (12)
159.	AS Itteville (12)	3–5	Gatinais Val de Loing FC (10)
160.	EFC Ecquevilly (14)	3–0	USL Presles (12)
161.	US Saclas-Méréville (12)	3–4	FC St Arnoult (12)
162.	Bagnolet FC (10)	3–0	UF Portugais Meaux (11)
163.	US Croissy (12)	2–1	ES St Prix (10)
164.	Dourdan Sport (9)	3–2	AS Maurepas (9)
165.	RC Presles-en-Brie (11)	1–0	UA Chantiers Paris (12)
166.	CO Othis (12)	5–3	Guyane FC Paris (13)
167.	Olympique Moncourt-Fromonville (12)	1–5	CO Vigneux (10)
168.	ES Montreuil (11)	3–0	FC La Plaine de France (11)
169.	Thorigny FC (11)	0–2	AS Bondy (9)
170.	Maisons-Laffitte FC (12)	5–2	Racine Club Asnières-sur-Seine (13)
171.	FC Villemoisson (12)	0–1	SC Briard (10)
172.	SS Noiseau (12)	6–2	Entente Bagneaux Nemours Saint-Pierre (12)
173.	AS Collégien (11)	1–3	Nicolaïte Chaillot Paris (10)
174.	UF Pommeuse-Farmoutiers (12)	0–3	FC Villepinte (10)
175.	SC Dugny (10)	4–1	US Roissy-en-Brie (9)
176.	AS Val de l'Yerres (12)	10–3	ASAF Perou (12)
177.	US Marly-le-Roi (9)	3–1	Salésienne de Paris (9)
178.	CS Dammartin (11)	3–2	FC Coubronnais (11)
179.	ES Pays de Bière (12)	0–3	FC Brunoy (9)
180.	AS La Plaine Victoire (12)	4–0	USA Feucherolles (14)

=== Second round ===
These matches were played between 16 May and 16 June 2019. Tiers shown reflect the 2018–19 season.

Second round results: Paris-Île-de-France
Tie no	Home team (tier)	Score	Away team (tier)
1.	ES Petit Anges Paris (12)	1–2 (Note: CSL Aulnay penalised for fielding too many players transferred outside the window. ES Petit Anges Paris qualify for the next round.)	CSL Aulnay (7)
2.	US Montsoult-Baillet-Maffliers (12)	3–0 (Note: Tie won through forfeit.)	L'EED FC (13)
3.	FC Solitaires Paris Est (9)	2–1 (a.e.t.)	ASC Velizy (10)
4.	AS Neuville-sur-Oise (10)	4–0	ES Jeunes Stade (11)
5.	US Croissy (12)	0–5	FC St Leu (6)
6.	Olympique Montigny (9)	0–3	US Rungis (6)
7.	FC Jouy-le-Moutier (9)	1–1 (13–12 p)	Amicale Villeneuve-la-Garenne (9)
8.	Sevran FC (9)	0–1	US Fontenay-sous-Bois (7)
9.	AS Breuilloise (12)	1–6	ACS Cormeillais (9)
10.	AS Beauchamp (10)	4–5	Flamboyants Villepinte (10)
11.	US Ormesson-sur-Marne (10)	1–0	Paray FC (7)
12.	AS Val de l'Yerres (12)	– (Note: Match was not played. According to the referee's report, only one player of FC Boissy and none of the AS Val de l'Yerres team were present at the ground at the scheduled kick-off time. Both teams eliminated from the competition.)	FC Boissy (10)
13.	US Hardricourt (9)	1–3	Cergy Pontoise FC (6)
14.	US Lagny Messagers (11)	0–1	UJA Maccabi Paris Métropole (6)
15.	FC Portugais US Ris-Orangis (11)	0–3	FC Melun (6)
16.	US Boissise-Pringy-Orgenoy (11)	3–1 (a.e.t.)	US Vert-le-Grand (12)
17.	FC Asnières (11)	0–6	AS Chatou (6)
18.	AS Choisy-le-Roi (7)	0–0 (3–4 p)	ES Colombienne (7)
19.	FC Coignières (11)	1–3	St Michel Sports (11)
20.	SC Gretz-Tournan (10)	5–0	Bagnolet FC (10)
21.	Paris IFA (12)	4–1	Viking Club de Paris (11)
22.	Épinay Académie (8)	2–2 (6–7 p)	Conflans FC (6)
23.	US Mauloise (10)	4–0 (Note: The original match was abandoned on 52 minutes, after a US Mauloise player broke the goalpost in the course of play. The match was replayed on 16 June.)	AS Courdimanche (11)
24.	USF Trilport (10)	3–2	FC Montfermeil (7)
25.	FC St Arnoult (12)	1–3	COM Bagneux (8)
26.	Fontenay-en-Parisis FC (11)	1–0	FS Esbly (11)
27.	AS Nanteuil-lès-Meaux (11)	2–1 (a.e.t.)	AC Orly (12)
28.	FC Goussainville (8)	1–2 (a.e.t.)	Neauphle-le-Château-Pontchartrain RC 78 (7)
29.	EFC Ecquevilly (14)	0–3	US Palaiseau (7)
30.	SS Noiseau (12)	– (Note: Match not played due to the pitch of SS Noiseau not being marked out. SS Noiseau penalised for this administrative error. Dourdan Sport qualify.)	Dourdan Sport (9)
31.	JS Bondy (12)	1–6	FC Parisis (8)
32.	St Thibault-des-Vignes FC (10)	0–2	CSM Gennevilliers (7)
33.	FC Brunoy (9)	4–2 (a.e.t.)	Val d'Europe FC (6)
34.	CS Berbère (11)	2–3	Maisons-Laffitte FC (12)
35.	CA Romainville (11)	2–4 (Note: Tie reversed from original draw.)	FC Bonneuil-en-France (11)
36.	CO Vigneux (10)	3–1	AAS Fresnes (11)
37.	FC Montmorency (11)	3–12	AC Houilles (7)
38.	ES Brie Nord (11)	2–4	USM Gagny (11)
39.	Benfica Argoselo Sports Paris (14)	0–5	Villebon SF (10)
40.	Aresport Stains 93 (11)	4–2	USM Bruyères-Bernes (11)
41.	FC Orsay-Bures (10)	1–3	ES Guyancourt St Quentin-en-Yvelines (9)
42.	ASC Réunionnais de Sénart (12)	3–1 (a.e.t.)	FC Boussy-Quincy (10)
43.	AS Chars (12)	1–4	Championnet Sports Paris (13)
44.	Olympique Paris 15 (14)	1–4	AS Ballainvilliers (11)
45.	FC St Germain-Saintry-St Pierre (10)	1–5	US Torcy (6)
46.	CS Assyro-Chaldéens Sarcelles (12)	1–5	AS Bondy (9)
47.	SFC Champagne 95 (10)	3–4	US Marly-le-Roi (9)
48.	La Camillienne Sports 12ème (10)	3–0	AC Villenoy (11)
49.	FO Plaisirois (9)	1–6	FC Étampes (8)
50.	AS Meudon (11)	0–5	FC Lissois (10)
51.	FC Villepinte (10)	1–4 (a.e.t.)	AAS Sarcelles (7)
52.	Arronville FC (12)	2–1	USA Clichy (10)
53.	FA Le Raincy (10)	0–5	St Brice FC (6)
54.	FC St Vrain (12)	2–3 (Note: AJ Antony penalised for fielding a suspended player. FC St Vrain qualify for the next round.)	AJ Antony (11)
55.	Enfants de la Goutte d'Or (10)	0–5	Mitry-Mory (8)
56.	Milly Gâtinais FC (11)	0–5 (Note: US Avonnaise penalised for fielding a suspended player. Milly Gâtinais FC qualify for the next round.)	US Avonnaise (8)
57.	FC Le Chesnay 78 (9)	1–2	Osny FC (8)
58.	Nicolaïte Chaillot Paris (10)	2–3 (a.e.t.)	ES Stains (10)
59.	Entente Pays du Limours (13)	1–4	ESC XVème (13)
60.	ES Marly-la-Ville (8)	5–1	US Montesson (9)
61.	CSM Puteaux (8)	2–4 (a.e.t.)	Villemomble Sports (7)
62.	AJ Étampoise (12)	– (Note: Both teams penalised, for unknown reasons. Subject to further committee procedures.)	Élan Chevilly-Larue (11)
63.	SC Luth (13)	5–2 (Note: SC Luth penalised for fielding a suspended player. AS Ermont qualify for the next round.)	AS Ermont (10)
64.	RC Arpajonnais (10)	4–2	OSC Élancourt (11)
65.	OC Gif Section Foot (10)	1–4	AC Paris 15 (8)
66.	AS Bourg-la-Reine (13)	2–1 (a.e.t.)	US Grigny (7)
67.	SO Vertois (13)	0–3	Val Yerres Crosne AF (7)
68.	Sèvres FC 92 (10)	2–3	US Villejuif (7)
69.	FC Issy-les-Moulineaux (7)	4–3	Évry FC (8)
70.	Aigle Fertoise Boissy le Cutté (11)	1–7	CA Vitry (7)
71.	ES Seizième (9)	3–1	US Alfortville (8)
72.	FC Région Houdanaise (10)	0–2	TU Verrières-le-Buisson (9)
73.	AS Ultra Marine Paris (10)	2–1	Espérance Paris 19ème (10)
74.	FC Deuil-Enghien (10)	7–0	FC St Germain-en-Laye (11)
75.	Olympique Neuilly (9)	0–2	Entente Méry-Mériel Bessancourt (10)
76.	USM Villeparisis (8)	2–4	ESA Linas-Montlhéry (6)
77.	CO Savigny (9)	4–3 (a.e.t.)	AF Garenne-Colombes (6)
78.	Pays Créçois FC (10)	3–2	FC Nogent-sur-Marne (10)
79.	FC Aulnay (10)	0–4	FC Franconville (8)
80.	CSM Eaubonne (12)	1–1 (1–4 p)	ASM Chambourcy (11)
81.	ASS Noiséenne (12)	2–1	Meaux ADOM (8)
82.	FC Magnanville (11)	4–1	FC Rueil Malmaison (8)
83.	ASC La Courneuve (9)	5–4 (a.e.t.)	Val de France Foot (9)
84.	ASM Ferté-sous-Jouarre (10)	0–6	Montreuil Red Star (6)
85.	St Cloud FC (9)	3–1	FC Maisons Alfort (8)
86.	Gatinais Val de Loing FC (10)	6–1	US Ris-Orangis (10)
87.	FC Écouen (9)	0–1	SC Dugny (10)
88.	AS Bois d'Arcy (10)	1–1 (5–4 p)	AS Saint-Ouen-l'Aumône (6)
89.	FC Courcouronnes (7)	4–1	ASA Montereau (8)
90.	AS Éragny FC (10)	3–2	CS Pouchet Paris XVII (12)
91.	Stade Vanve (9)	1–2	CO Vincennes (6)
92.	CO Othis (12)	2–7	FC Livry-Gargan (7)
93.	AS Arnouville (11)	1–8	US Verneuil-sur-Seine (10)
94.	AS Soisy-sur-Seine (9)	0–9	Montrouge FC 92 (7)
95.	US Persan (9)	1–2	ALJ Limay (7)
96.	ASL Janville Lardy (11)	1–2 (a.e.t.)	FC Vallée 78 (10)
97.	AS Lieusaint (10)	3–4	ES Viry-Châtillon (6)
98.	AJ Limeil-Brévannes (10)	3–2	CS Mennecy (10)
99.	CSA Kremlin-Bicêtre (11)	0–9	St Denis US (6)
100.	ES Trappes (8)	2–0	RFC Argenteuil (7)
101.	AS St Mard (11)	2–12	SFC Neuilly-sur-Marne (7)
102.	St Maur VGA (9)	1–2 (a.e.t.)	Noisy-le-Grand FC (6)
103.	UF Clichois (9)	1–3	AS Menucourt (10)
104.	Bondoufle AC (12)	1–4	JSC Pitray-Olier (10)
105.	CO Cachan (9)	3–1	Tremplin Foot (8)
106.	Olympique Viarmes Asnières-sur-Oise (11)	3–2	ES Parisienne (7)
107.	AS Carrières Grésillons (9)	4–2	JS Suresnes (8)
108.	FC Puiseux-Louvres (12)	0–4	OFC Pantin (8)
109.	USC Lésigny (10)	5–1 (Note: USC Lésigny penalised for fielding suspended players. Draveil FC qualify.)	Draveil FC (10)
110.	US Yvelines (12)	0–3	FC Igny (8)
111.	GAFE Plessis-Bouchard (11)	0–7	Courbevoie Sports (7)
112.	AS Bruyères (11)	1–5	AS Montigny-le-Bretonneux (10)
113.	RC Presles-en-Brie (11)	1–15	Sucy FC (6)
114.	FC Les Lilas (6)	1–4	Claye-Souilly SF (7)
115.	FC Chaville (11)	8–1	CSM Bonneuil-sur-Marne (8)
116.	SC Épinay-sur-Orge (10)	1–3	ES Cesson Vert St Denis (7)
117.	Entraide Franco Egéenne (12)	2–6	USM Malakoff (10)
118.	AC Gentilly (11)	1–2	ASA Issy (7)
119.	SC Briard (10)	0–3	FC Morangis-Chilly (7)
120.	FC St Mande (10)	2–1	US Vaires-sur-Marne (8)
121.	ES Nanterre (7)	3–2	Aubergenville FC (8)
122.	FC Vaujours (11)	1–2	FC Ozoir-la-Ferrière 77 (7)
123.	Grigny FC (13)	1–3	Champigny FC 94 (7)
124.	Argenteuil FC (10)	1–3	Espérance Aulnay (7)
125.	US Carrières-sur-Seine (10)	1–0	Cosmo Taverny (7)
126.	USC Mantes (13)	1–3	Olympique Adamois (7)
127.	FC Wissous (11)	3–3 (5–4 p)	US Sénart-Moissy (6)
128.	USD Ferrières-en-Brie (11)	3–7	ES Montreuil (11)
129.	JS Villiers-le-Bel (11)	0–2	US Lognes (8)
130.	CS Dammartin (11)	0–3	AS La Plaine Victoire (12)
131.	FC Plessis-Robinson (6)	3–2 (a.e.t.)	CA Paris-Charenton (8)
132.	Garches Vaucresson FC (14)	5–1	AS Versailles Jussieu (13)
133.	Morsang-sur-Orge FC (11)	4–5	CA Paris (8)

=== Third round ===
These matches were played on 15 September 2019.

Third round results: Paris-Île-de-France
Tie no	Home team (tier)	Score	Away team (tier)
1.	FC Plessis-Robinson (6)	0–1 (Note: Tie reversed because ALJ Limay did not propose a ground with the correct grading.)	ALJ Limay (7)
2.	FC St Leu (5)	5–2 (Note: Tie reversed with agreement of both clubs.)	Aresport Stains 93 (10)
3.	Entente Méry-Mériel Bessancourt (10)	0–2	FC Versailles 78 (5)
4.	Villebon SF (10)	4–5 (a.e.t.)	CA Vitry (7)
5.	FC Étampes (8)	1–4	Claye-Souilly SF (7)
6.	AS Menucourt (10)	2–3	FC Wissous (10)
7.	FC St Vrain (12)	0–1	USM Malakoff (11)
8.	St Cloud FC (9)	0–1	OFC Les Mureaux (5)
9.	FC Romainville (10)	3–0	FC St Mande (10)
10.	US Marly-le-Roi (8)	0–1	FCM Aubervilliers (5)
11.	US Ormesson-sur-Marne (10)	1–3	Le Mée Sports (6)
12.	AS Montigny-le-Bretonneux (10)	1–4	FC Brunoy (9)
13.	AS Éragny FC (10)	1–0 (Note: Tie reversed because the ground of ES Petit Anges Paris does not have the correct grading.) (Note: AS Éragny FC penalised for fielding a suspended player. ES Petit Anges Paris qualify.)	ES Petit Anges Paris (12)
14.	AS Nanteuil-lès-Meaux (10)	2–3 (a.e.t.)	FC Melun (7)
15.	Arronville FC (11)	0–7	Montrouge FC 92 (6)
16.	Milly Gâtinais FC (11)	1–5	ASA Issy (7)
17.	ES Guyancourt St Quentin-en-Yvelines (10)	6–2	US Montsoult-Baillet-Maffliers (11)
18.	AS Carrières Grésillons (9)	0–1	FC Issy-les-Moulineaux (7)
19.	FC Ozoir-la-Ferrière 77 (7)	2–4	US Rungis (6)
20.	SFC Neuilly-sur-Marne (7)	2–1	AC Paris 15 (8)
21.	AS La Plaine Victoire (12)	1–8	Olympique Adamois (7)
22.	US Palaiseau (7)	5–0 (Note: Tie reversed because the ground of JSC Pitray-Olier does not have the correct grading.)	JSC Pitray-Olier (10)
23.	Dourdan Sport (9)	3–0	ASC Réunionnais de Sénart (11)
24.	USF Trilport (11)	0–0 (4–5 p)	US Villejuif (7)
25.	Pays Créçois FC (9)	2–4 (a.e.t.)	Olympique Noisy-le-Sec (6)
26.	RC Arpajonnais (10)	0–5	Racing CFF (5)
27.	US Lognes (9)	3–5	AAS Sarcelles (7)
28.	Conflans FC (7)	1–3 (a.e.t.)	Espérance Aulnay (6)
29.	FC Magnanville (10)	3–5	CSM Gennevilliers (7)
30.	ASC La Courneuve (8)	3–4 (a.e.t.)	ES Nanterre (7)
31.	Draveil FC (10)	2–4	Blanc-Mesnil SF (5)
32.	Championnet Sports Paris (12)	0–3	Montreuil FC (6)
33.	FC Jouy-le-Moutier (10)	1–7	ES Colombienne (6)
34.	ACS Cormeillais (9)	0–2 (a.e.t.)	CS Brétigny (6)
35.	AS Neuville-sur-Oise (10)	0–3 (Note: AS Neuville-sur-Oise forfeited the tie due to not being able to provide a ground with the required grading.)	US Torcy PVM (5)
36.	Gatinais Val de Loing FC (10)	0–2 (a.e.t.)	FC Igny (8)
37.	CO Vigneux (11)	0–2	AS Ermont (9)
38.	Maisons-Laffitte FC (12)	3–0	Garches Vaucresson FC (13)
39.	SC Gretz-Tournan (9)	6–0	ES Trappes (7)
40.	FC Parisis (8)	0–1	ESA Linas-Montlhéry (6)
41.	US Boissise-Pringy-Orgenoy (10)	0–8	ES Viry-Châtillon (6)
42.	ASM Chambourcy (11)	1–3	Champigny FC 94 (7)
43.	FC Bonneuil-en-France (12)	1–3	AS Bourg-la-Reine (12)
44.	FC Chaville (11)	0–4	US Fontenay-sous-Bois (7)
45.	FC Livry-Gargan (7)	1–4	CO Les Ulis (5)
46.	Mitry-Mory (8)	3–0 (Note: FC Lissois failed to show for the fixture. Mitry-Mory qualify.)	FC Lissois (9)
47.	FC Deuil-Enghien (9)	0–6	US Ivry (5)
48.	US Verneuil-sur-Seine (10)	0–4	Noisy-le-Grand FC (5)
49.	ES Montreuil (11)	2–4	FC Courcouronnes (7)
50.	Villemomble Sports (7)	2–0	Sucy FC (6)
51.	Flamboyants Villepinte (9)	3–2	Osny FC (8)
52.	AS Bondy (9)	0–0 (6–7 p)	CO Savigny (9)
53.	Olympique Viarmes Asnières-sur-Oise (11)	0–5	ES Stains (9)
54.	ES Marly-la-Ville (8)	2–2 (3–2 p)	CO Cachan (9)
55.	ASS Noiséenne (11)	0–3	Neauphle-le-Château-Pontchartrain RC 78 (7)
56.	ESC XVème (13)	1–3	TU Verrières-le-Buisson (9)
57.	AJ Limeil-Brévannes (10)	0–2	ES Seizième (8)
58.	USM Gagny (10)	1–2	US Carrières-sur-Seine (10)
59.	FC Solitaires Paris Est (9)	0–3	CS Meaux (6)
60.	St Denis US (6)	2–0 (a.e.t.)	Fontenay-en-Parisis FC (11)
61.	SC Dugny (10)	2–1	AS Bois d'Arcy (9)
62.	COM Bagneux (8)	1–2	AS Chatou (6)
63.	ES Cesson Vert St Denis (7)	1–2	CO Vincennes (6)
64.	St Michel Sports (11)	0–11	CA Paris (9)
65.	AS Ultra Marine Paris (10)	4–0	Paris IFA (11)
66.	FC Vallée 78 (10)	1–0 (a.e.t.)	Courbevoie Sports (7)
67.	Val Yerres Crosne AF (7)	0–2	St Brice FC (6)
68.	La Camillienne Sports 12ème (10)	0–5	FC Franconville (8)

=== Fourth round ===
These matches were played on 28 and 29 September 2019.

Fourth round results: Paris-Île-de-France
Tie no	Home team (tier)	Score	Away team (tier)
1.	FC Igny (8)	1–0	FCM Aubervilliers (5)
2.	FC Wissous (10)	1–3	Blanc-Mesnil SF (5)
3.	AS Ballainvilliers (11)	0–5	AC Houilles (7)
4.	UJA Maccabi Paris Métropole (7)	2–2 (4–1 p)	FC Mantois 78 (4)
5.	AAS Sarcelles (7)	5–2	ES Marly-la-Ville (8)
6.	St Denis US (6)	3–2	Cergy Pontoise FC (6)
7.	USM Malakoff (11)	0–4	Montrouge FC 92 (6)
8.	ES Petit Anges Paris (12)	0–3	AS Chatou (6)
9.	Neauphle-le-Château-Pontchartrain RC 78 (7)	0–2	FC Gobelins (4)
10.	SC Dugny (10)	0–2	CS Brétigny (6)
11.	ES Colombienne (6)	1–1 (5–6 p)	FC St Leu (5)
12.	Dourdan Sport (9)	0–1	ESA Linas-Montlhéry (6)
13.	US Palaiseau (7)	0–2	Sainte-Geneviève Sports (4)
14.	FC Versailles 78 (5)	4–2	CO Vincennes (6)
15.	Noisy-le-Grand FC (5)	0–3	US Lusitanos Saint-Maur (4)
16.	CO Savigny (9)	0–1	FC Courcouronnes (7)
17.	FC Brunoy (9)	0–1	Olympique Adamois (7)
18.	FC Franconville (8)	1–1 (4–1 p)	Champigny FC 94 (7)
19.	Flamboyants Villepinte (9)	1–2 (a.e.t.)	US Rungis (6)
20.	AS Bourg-la-Reine (12)	3–1	ES Stains (9)
21.	CSM Gennevilliers (7)	3–2 (Note: Tie reversed from original draw.)	ALJ Limay (7)
22.	Le Mée Sports (6)	1–0	SFC Neuilly-sur-Marne (7)
23.	TU Verrières-le-Buisson (9)	0–5	L'Entente SSG (4)
24.	US Mauloise (10)	0–6	JA Drancy (4)
25.	CA Paris (9)	4–2 (a.e.t.)	AS Ultra Marine Paris (10)
26.	FC Melun (7)	0–1	Villemomble Sports (7)
27.	US Fontenay-sous-Bois (7)	1–1 (1–3 p)	FC Fleury 91 (4)
28.	CS Meaux (6)	7–0	US Carrières-sur-Seine (10)
29.	FC Romainville (10)	– (Note: Match abandoned near the end of normal time, with the scoreline 2–2, after a protest over a refereeing decision which left the referee feeling in danger. FC Romainville penalised, CO Les Ulis qualify.)	CO Les Ulis (5)
30.	CA Vitry (7)	2–2 (2–4 p)	US Ivry (5)
31.	ES Nanterre (7)	4–0	Maisons-Laffitte FC (12)
32.	Olympique Noisy-le-Sec (6)	2–1	US Villejuif (7)
33.	ES Seizième (8)	2–2 (6–5 p)	SC Gretz-Tournan (9)
34.	Espérance Aulnay (6)	2–1	OFC Les Mureaux (5)
35.	Racing CFF (5)	– (Note: Match abandoned 20 minutes from the end, with the scoreline 2–2, after fighting on the pitch and in the stands. Both sides penalised and removed from the competition.)	US Torcy PVM (5)
36.	OFC Pantin (8)	1–3	AS Poissy (4)
37.	FC Vallée 78 (10)	1–3	St Brice FC (6)
38.	AS Ermont (9)	0–1	ASA Issy (7)
39.	FC Issy-les-Moulineaux (7)	1–3	Montreuil FC (6)
40.	Claye-Souilly SF (7)	0–4	ES Viry-Châtillon (6)
41.	FC Morangis-Chilly (7)	0–1	AF Bobigny (4)
42.	ES Guyancourt St Quentin-en-Yvelines (10)	0–5	Mitry-Mory (8)

=== Fifth round ===
These matches were played on 12 and 13 October 2019.

Fifth round results: Paris-Île-de-France
Tie no	Home team (tier)	Score	Away team (tier)
1.	UJA Maccabi Paris Métropole (7)	4–1	FC St Leu (5)
2.	AC Houilles (7)	0–2	Olympique Adamois (7)
3.	AS Bourg-la-Reine (12)	2–6	AAS Sarcelles (7)
4.	ESA Linas-Montlhéry (6)	– (Note: Walkover for ESA Linas-Montlhéry, as both sides from the fourth round tie were removed from the competition.)	winner tie 35
5.	Mitry-Mory (8)	1–2	ES Viry-Châtillon (6)
6.	CS Brétigny (6)	1–0	AF Bobigny (4)
7.	Olympique Noisy-le-Sec (6)	2–0	AS Poissy (4)
8.	Villemomble Sports (7)	3–2 (a.e.t.)	US Rungis (6)
9.	CSM Gennevilliers (7)	2–1	US Lusitanos Saint-Maur (4)
10.	Le Mée Sports (6)	0–1 (a.e.t.)	L'Entente SSG (4)
11.	FC Courcouronnes (7)	0–1	FC Versailles 78 (5)
12.	St Brice FC (6)	1–2	FC Fleury 91 (4)
13.	Sainte-Geneviève Sports (4)	4–3	US Ivry (5)
14.	CO Les Ulis (5)	1–3	Red Star FC (3)
15.	FC Franconville (8)	1–0 (a.e.t.)	Montrouge FC 92 (6)
16.	ES Nanterre (7)	1–0	FC Igny (8)
17.	Blanc-Mesnil SF (5)	1–0	St Denis US (6)
18.	CA Paris (9)	0–1	Montreuil FC (6)
19.	ASA Issy (7)	0–4	FC Gobelins (4)
20.	ES Seizième (8)	1–3	Espérance Aulnay (6)
21.	JA Drancy (4)	1–2 (a.e.t.)	US Créteil-Lusitanos (3)
22.	AS Chatou (6)	3–3 (5–6 p)	CS Meaux (6)

=== Sixth round ===
These matches were played on 26 and 27 October 2019.

Sixth round results: Paris-Île-de-France
Tie no	Home team (tier)	Score	Away team (tier)
1.	Montreuil FC (6)	2–3	CSM Gennevilliers (7)
2.	AAS Sarcelles (7)	0–3	Red Star FC (3)
3.	CS Brétigny (6)	3–3 (3–5 p)	Sainte-Geneviève Sports (4)
4.	CS Meaux (6)	1–1 (3–2 p)	FC Fleury 91 (4)
5.	ES Viry-Châtillon (6)	0–0 (4–5 p)	FC Versailles 78 (5)
6.	ES Nanterre (7)	2–1 (a.e.t.)	UJA Maccabi Paris Métropole (7)
7.	L'Entente SSG (4)	3–1	FC Gobelins (4)
8.	ESA Linas-Montlhéry (6)	3–2 (a.e.t.)	Espérance Aulnay (6)
9.	Olympique Noisy-le-Sec (6)	0–2	US Créteil-Lusitanos (3)
10.	Olympique Adamois (7)	3–2	FC Franconville (8)
11.	Villemomble Sports (7)	1–0	Blanc-Mesnil SF (5)
