= Paris Université Club (baseball) =

Paris University Club
- Paris Université Club

Information
- Affiliations: FFBS (fr)
- League: Championnat de France de baseball (Élite D1)
- Location: Paris
- Ballpark: Stade Pershing
- Founded: 1923
- Nickname(s): PUC, Paris UC
- League championships: 22 (1955, 1965, 1966, 1970, 1972, 1973, 1975, 1976, 1977, 1980, 1982, 1983, 1984, 1985, 1986, 1987, 1988, 1989, 1990, 1991, 1992, 2000)
- Colors: Purple, White, Black
- President: Olivier Dubaut

Current uniforms
Rookies	Elites

The Paris Université Club plays baseball in Division Élite. They have been the most successful club in league history, sporting 22 titles. They won Bronze in the 1993 European Cup, the first French team to win a Medal in Cup history. They are a part of the omnisport club (PUC).

== See also ==
- Paris Université Club
