= Fabien Vidalon =

French footballer (born 1976)

Personal information
- Full name: Fabien Serge Vidalon
- Date of birth: 26 August 1976 (age 50)
- Place of birth: France
- Positions: Defender; midfielder

Senior career*
Years	Team	Apps	(Gls)
–1998	Fréjus Saint-Raphaël		
1998–2001	Viry-Châtillon		
2001–2002	Romorantin		
2002–2004	Dijon	2+	(0+)
2005	Sète	18	(0)
2006–2010	Moss	95	(17)
2011–2012	Drøbak-Frogn	13+	(1+)
2013–2014	Huringen IF	28	(5)
- * Club domestic league appearances and goals

Fabien Vidalon (born 26 August 1976) is a French former footballer who is last known to have played as a defender or midfielder for Huringen IF.

== Career ==
In 1998, Vidalon signed for French fourth division side Viry-Châtillon from Fréjus Saint-Raphaël in the French third division.

Before the second half of 2004/05, he signed for French second division club Sète, where he made 18 league appearances and scored 0 goals.

Before the 2006 season, Vidalon signed for Moss in the Norwegian second division.

In 2010, he was suspended for 3 games due to a bad tackle on Simen Rafn during a 5–1 loss to FFK.

Before the 2011 season, he signed for Norwegian fourth division team Drøbak-Frogn.

Before the 2013 season, Vidalon signed for Huringen IF in the Norwegian seventh division.
