= CS Meaux =

French football club

- Logo of the club
- Full name: CS Meaux Academy Football
- Ground: A.Corazza Stadium
- Capacity: 2,000
- Coordinates: 48°56′40.91″N 2°54′7.05″E
- President: JEAN LUC LARRET
- Technical Director: Fabrice Moreau
- League: LIGUE DE PARIS ILE-DE-FRANCE, Senior R1, Pool B
- 2023: 3
- Website: https://www.fff.fr/competition/club/500831-cs-meaux-academy-football/information.html

CS Meaux Academy Football is a French football club, based in the town of Meaux. Former players include Marc Lévy, Philippe Anziani, Francis Llacer, Frédéric Déhu, Franck Leboeuf Andrzej Zgutczyński, Joël Cantona, and the goalkeeper Yohann Pelé, Geoffrey Jourdren.

== Players ==
=== Current squad ===
As of 13 April 2019.

Note: Flags indicate national team as defined under FIFA eligibility rules; some limited exceptions apply. Players may hold more than one non-FIFA nationality.

No.	Pos.	Nation	Player
—	GK	FRA	Samir Ghrab
—	GK	FRA	Babou Yattabare
—	DF	FRA	Franck Bailly
—	DF	FRA	Bissafi Dotte
—	DF	FRA	Mohamed Kamara
—	DF	FRA	Antonin Mendy
—	DF	FRA	Charles Régis
—	DF	FRA	Jessy Youmbi
—	MF	FRA	Julien Allaf
—	MF	FRA	Moussa Camara

No.	Pos.	Nation	Player
—	MF	FRA	Abel Ladjimi
—	MF	FRA	Younes Mokrane
—	MF	FRA	Eric NJankou
—	MF	FRA	Daniel Semroud
—	FW	FRA	Billal El Fathi
—	FW	FRA	Karim Herouat
—	FW	MLI	Mamadou Niane
—	FW	FRA	Michaël Niçoise
—	FW	FRA	Bilal Reffas
—	FW	FRA	Yann Bengo Mbuta

== Notable players ==
- (France) Frank Leboeuf (youth)
- (Mali) Ibrahima Sissoko (youth)
