= US Ivry =

French sports club

- Full name: Union Sportive d'Ivry
- Founded: 1919
- Ground: Stade Clerville; Ivry-sur-Seine, Val-de-Marne
- Capacity: 2,000
- Chairman: Michel Bouvat
- Manager: Pierre Mbappé
- League: National 3 Group H
- 2022–23: National 3 Group L, 8th
- Website: www.usivryfootball.com
Home colours	Away colours

Union Sportive d'Ivry are a French multi-sports club based in Ivry-sur-Seine, Val-de-Marne. The club is primarily known for its football team and handball team. US Ivry play their home matches at the Stade Clerville, which seats 2,000 spectators.

== History ==
The club was founded in 1919 by Socialist Youth activists in the name of Union Sportive du Travail d'Ivry (USTI). The club's first chairman was Gaston Richard. Early in the club's foundation, they primarily focused on the football, athletics, and basketball sections of the club. As the club grew in size, so did the membership and the club eventually developed new sporting sections such as cycling, gymnastics, boxing, and tennis. In 1934, the club merged with two local clubs to form a new club called Etoile Sportive du Travail d'Ivry.

After the second World War, in 1949, the club changed its name to its current form Union Sportive d'Ivry. Three years later, the club's stadium, Stade Clerville, was built. In 2006, the club had 36 sections of sport with over 6,000 members.

In April 2023, former chairman of the club, and uncle of current Paris Saint Germain and French forward, Kylian Mbappé, Pierre Mbappé, was appointed manager of the club, succeeding Jacques-Olivier Paviot. Mbappé having previously managed the team between 2008 and 2013.

== Honours ==
- Coupe de Paris: 1995, 2008
- Coupe de Val-de-Marne: 1995, 2008
- Promotion d'Honneur Champion: 1992
- Division d'Honneur Regionale Champion: 1995
- Division d'Honneur Champion: 1998

== Players ==
=== Current squad ===
As of 21 April 2023

Note: Flags indicate national team as defined under FIFA eligibility rules; some limited exceptions apply. Players may hold more than one non-FIFA nationality.

No.	Pos.	Nation	Player
—	GK	FRA	Salif Soumaré
—	GK	FRA	Jason Mukulu
—	GK	FRA	Dembo Fofana
—	DF	FRA	Aldric Lobé
—	DF	FRA	Alexandre Tadembo
—	DF	MTQ	Karl Phaëton
—	DF	FRA	Daryl Fumu Konzo
—	DF	FRA	Mickaël Clio
—	DF	BRA	Polidoro Junior
—	DF	ENG	Toby Brown
—	DF	FRA	Jason Bli
—	DF	FRA	Henry Solomon
—	MF	FRA	Kemokho Diakhaby
—	MF	FRA	Sami Baaboura
—	MF	FRA	Alane Dorol
—	MF	FRA	Emmanuel Doe Reiz Alvarez
—	MF	FRA	Amine Oubachir

No.	Pos.	Nation	Player
—	MF	FRA	Anthony Lages
—	MF	ALG	Eyles Seddiki
—	MF	FRA	Benjamin Louvet
—	MF	FRA	Vassikiri Traoré
—	MF	FRA	Bandiougou Dabo
—	MF	GUI	Mohamed Conté
—	FW	FRA	Olivier-Pierre Dionga
—	FW	FRA	Charles Minselebe
—	FW	FRA	Diambere Diarra
—	FW	MTQ	Ken Phaëton
—	FW	FRA	Ramsey Mbaku
—	FW	FRA	Siméon Oure
—	FW	FRA	Alexandre Bossé
—	FW	GLP	Claudio Beauvue
—	FW	FRA	Kleyveens Hérelle
—	FW	FRA	Florian Mautil
—	FW	FRA	Ali Tounkara

== Notable players ==
- (France) Lamine Cissé (youth)
- (France) Lucas Michal (youth)
- (France) Kassoum Ouattara (youth)

== See also ==
- US d'Ivry Handball
