= Paris Université Club =

French multi-sports club

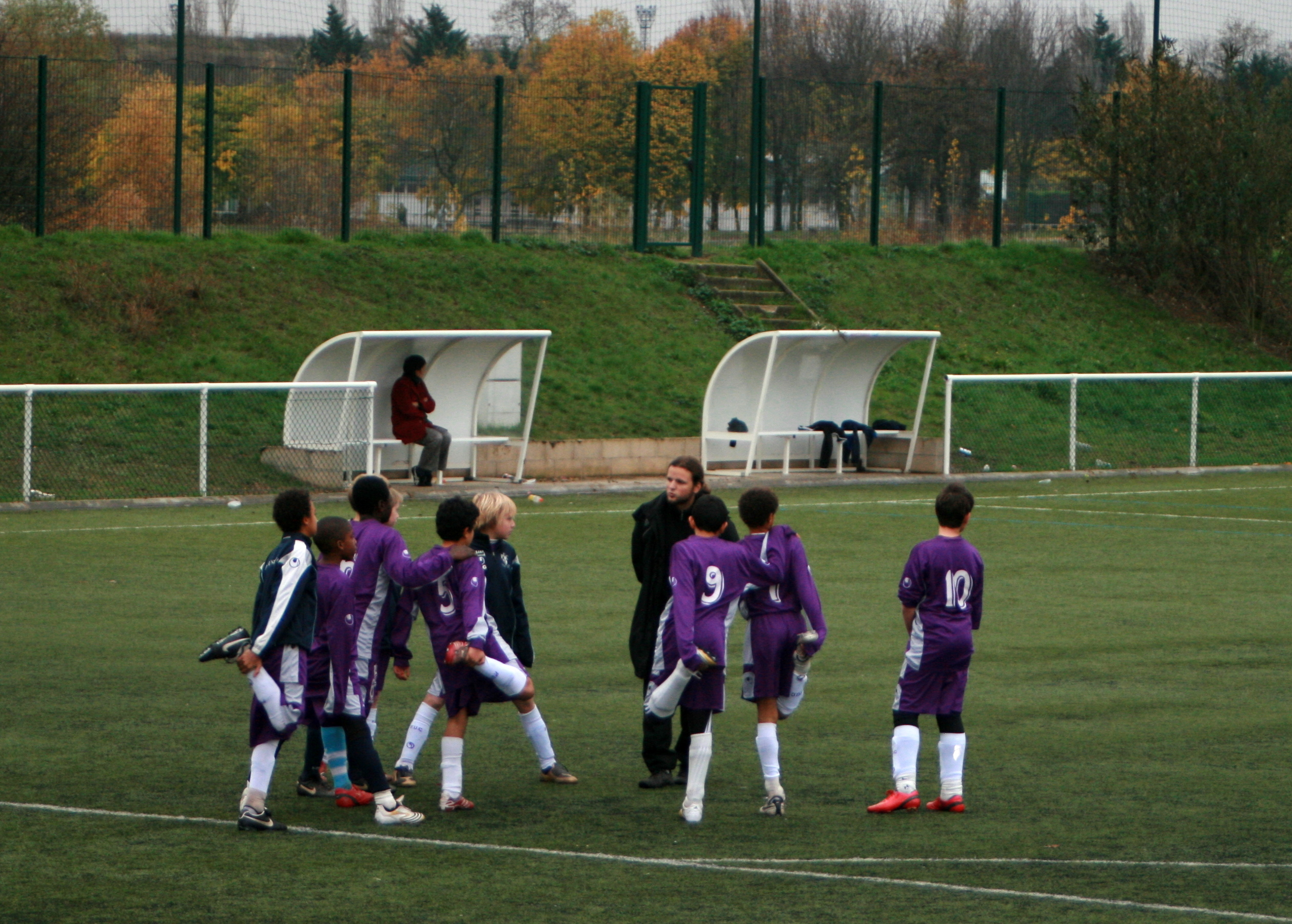
Young footballers of PUC

The Paris Université Club, also known as Paris UC and PUC, is a French multi-sport club that was founded on 1 May 1906. The club is located in the Stade Charléty, built for it in the 13th arrondissement of Paris.

It is the sport club of the former University of Paris and of the thirteen universities of Paris, and is located near the University campus, the Cité internationale universitaire de Paris.

== History ==
The club was founded on 1 May 1906 at the Café Voltaire in Paris by around sixty students, arising from the merger of two existing student sporting associations, the Association Sportive Amicale des Scolaires de Paris and the Association Sportive des Étudiants de Paris. Its first president was Eugène Olivier, a fencer and medical intern in the Paris hospital system. The club adopted purple and white as its colours, representing the traditional academic virtues of knowledge and purity (white) and modesty and personal growth (purple).

== Sports ==
The club offers the following sports, among others:

- Baseball: Paris Université Club (baseball)
- Rugby union: Paris Université Club (rugby union)
- Volleyball: Paris Volley
- Athletics
- Badminton
- Basketball: Paris Université Club (basketball)
- Fencing
- Floorball
- Football
- Handball
- Judo
- Parachuting
- Roller skating
- Skiing
- Tennis
