= FC Morangis-Chilly =

Football club in Morangis, France

Morangis-Chilly
- Full name: Football Club de Morangis-Chilly
- Short name: FCMC
- Stadium: Stade Municipal de Morangis
- President: Jacques Anime
- League: Régional 2 Paris Île-de-France; Group A
- Website: https://www.fcmc91.com/

Football Club de Morangis-Chilly is a football club located in Morangis, France. They play in the Régional 2, seventh tier of French football.

The furthest Morangis-Chilly has gone in the Coupe de France is the round of 64, which they reached in the 1976–77 edition of the tournament, losing 3–1 to first-tier Lens.

== Notable former players ==
- (France) Jean-Claude Fernandes
- (France) Eddy Gnahoré
- (France) Mario Mongelli
- (France) Stéphane Persol
- (France) Jean-Marc Pilorget
