= 2017–18 Coupe de France preliminary rounds, Paris-Île-de-France =

The 2017–18 Coupe de France preliminary rounds, Paris-Île-de-France make up the qualifying competition to decide which teams from the Paris-Île-de-France region teams take part in the main competition from the seventh round.

== First round ==
The matches in Paris-Île-de-France were played between 7 May and 31 May 2017. Tiers shown reflect the 2016–17 season.

First round results: Paris-Île-de-France

Tie no	Home team (tier)	Score	Away team (tier)
1.	FC Puiseux-Louvres (13)	0–7	USBS Épône (11)
2.	Brie FC (13)	7–2	Phare Sportive Zarzissien (13)
3.	Thiais FC (12)	3–2	AJSC Nanterre (10)
4.	ES Petit Anges Paris (13)	3–2	Melting Sport (14)
5.	FC Paris 17 (15)	0–7	Enfants de la Goutte d'Or (11)
6.	Aresport Stains 93 (14)	5–0	Union Fosses (13)
7.	FC Jouy-le-Moutier (11)	5–4	FC Porcheville (10)
8.	Coulommiers Brie (10)	3–1	Entente Longueville Ste Colombe St Loup-de-Naud Soisy-Bouy (10)
9.	FC Varennes-sur-Seine (13)	3–4 (a.e.t.)	FC Boussy-Quincy (11)
10.	US Vert-le-Grand (13)	10–1	Amicale Bocage (13)
11.	Olympique Moncourt-Fromonville (13)	0–5 (Note: Game won through forfeit)	CS Mennecy (11)
12.	ES Forêt (13)	2–3	FC St Germain-Saintry-St Pierre (11)
13.	UF Pommeuse-Farmoutiers (13)	0–1	Vaux-le-Pénil La Rochette (11)
14.	FC Milly-la-Forêt (13)	1–1 (4–2 p)	Héricy-Vulaines-Samoreau (13)
15.	ES Villabé (12)	3–5	RCP Fontainebleau (10)
16.	ES Jouy-Yvron (13)	2–4	SC Gretz-Tournan (10)
17.	US Chaumes-Gignes (11)	1–3	USD Ferrières-en-Brie (12)
18.	Turc FC Montereau (12)	0–5	FC Lissois (11)
19.	Morsang-sur-Orge FC (14)	0–5	Gatinais Val de Loing (10)
20.	FC Ballancourt (12)	4–3	FC Intercommunal Loing (11)
21.	Grigny FC (14)	5–0	Entente Bagneaux Nemours Saint-Pierre (10)
22.	AJ Limeil-Brévannes (11)	void (Note: Game void in favour of AJ Limeil-Brévannes due to AS Corbeil-Essonnes having been ejected from the league and therefore no longer meeting the conditions for participation in the competition.)	AS Corbeil-Essonnes (10)
23.	FC Moret-Veneux Sablons (13)	2–3 (a.e.t.)	Aigle Fertoise Boissy le Cutté (13)
24.	US Avonnaise (10)	1–5	AS Soisy-sur-Seine (10)
25.	AS Itteville (14)	5–0	US Boissise-Pringy-Orgenoy (13)
26.	AS Saintry (14)	1–1 (4–2 p)	US Châtelet-en-Brie (13)
27.	ES Saint-Germain-Laval (11)	3–3 (4–5 p)	Draveil FC (11)
28.	AS Fontenay-Trésigny (11)	3–3 (7–6 p)	Briard SC (10)
29.	Marcoussis Nozay La-Ville-du-Bois FC (11)	0–1	US Ponthierry (10)
30.	FC Bois-le-Roi (11)	0–1	Portugais Pontault-Combault (10)
31.	USM Verneuil (13)	3–2	Pays Créçois FC (11)
32.	ES Montgeron (10)	0–4	FC Nandy (10)
33.	ES Nangis (13)	9–2	FC Marolles (12)
34.	FC Coudraysien (14)	0–5	AS Lieusaint (11)
35.	CA Combs-la-Ville (11)	2–4	US Roissy-en-Brie (10)
36.	USC Lesigny (11)	4–1	Magny-le-Hongre FC (11)
37.	FC Chevry Cosigny 77 (13)	3–1	SO Rozay-en-Brie (13)
38.	Savigny-le-Temple FC (10)	1–2	Cheminots Villeneuve-St Georges (10)
39.	AS Courdimanche (12)	4–0	ES Bouafle-Flins (14)
40.	Villeneuve-la-Garenne (11)	7–1	Bougival (12)
41.	FC Plateau Bréval Longnes (12)	1–0	AS Menucourt (11)
42.	FC Rambouillet Yvelines (12)	0–2	Dourdan Sport (11)
43.	ES Plateau de Saclay (14)	0–5	US 17 Tournants (14)
44.	AGS Essarts-le-Roi (14)	2–1	OC Gif Section Foot (11)
45.	US Croissy (13)	1–3	TU Verrières-le-Buisson (10)
46.	FC St Arnoult (14)	3–5 (a.e.t.)	RC Arpajonnais (11)
47.	ES Vauxoise (15)	1–5	AS Ollainville (12)
48.	AS Vexin (11)	2–2 (3–4 p)	CSM Rosny-sur-Seine (11)
49.	SFC Champagne 95 (13)	3–4	AC Triel (13)
50.	CO Cheminots Chambly (13)	3–5 (a.e.t.)	Portugais Conflans (14)
51.	FC Coignières (13)	1–2	FC Orsay-Bures (11)
52.	AS Guernoise (14)	0–5	St Cloud FC (11)
53.	US Yvelines (14)	0–2	SCM Châtillonnais (11)
54.	Garches Vaucresson FC (15)	5–0	Bonnières-sur-Seine Freneuse (13)
55.	Ablis FC Sud 78 (15)	1–2	US Saclas-Méréville (13)
56.	ES Perray (15)	1–6	FC Boissy-sous-St Yon (14)
57.	FC Région Houdanaise (13)	0–6	Sèvres FC 92 (11)
58.	FC Trois Vallées (13)	2–8	FC Vallée 78 (11)
59.	FC Massy 91 (11)	1–2	AS Bois d'Arcy (11)
60.	CO Savigny (10)	2–1 (a.e.t.)	US Jouy-en-Josas (11)
61.	JA Montrouge (15)	0–9	SFC Bailly Noisy-le-Roi (11)
62.	FC Beynes (13)	3–3 (3–2 p)	AS Meudon (12)
63.	FC La Verrière (15)	3–0	FC Longjumeau (11)
64.	AS Fontenay-le-Fleury (14)	2–3 (a.e.t.)	Villebon SF (11)
65.	FC Wissous (12)	1–2	ASC Velizy (11)
66.	CO Champlan (14)	1–2	Villepreux FC (11)
67.	OSC Élancourt (12)	2–2 (5–4 p)	AS Ballainvilliers (13)
68.	AJ Antony (13)	1–2	FC Étampes (10)
69.	AO Buc Foot (12)	0–7	FC Brunoy (12)
70.	FC Athis Mons (11)	2–1	USM Les Clayes-sous-Bois (11)
71.	FC Vaujours (13)	3–0	US Quincy-Voisins FC (10)
72.	CSM Coubron (11)	3–2	ASM Ferté-sous-Jouarre (11)
73.	USF Trilport (11)	1–2	AS Bondy (10)
74.	FC Gournay (12)	2–1	FS Esbly (13)
75.	CS Mouroux (13)	2–3 (a.e.t.)	Portugais Académica Champigny (13)
76.	FC Antillais Paris 19ème (14)	3–2	ES Moussy-le-Neuf (12)
77.	FC May-en-Multien (13)	0–5	ES Marly-la-Ville (10)
78.	CS Villeroy (13)	2–3	UF Clichois (10)
79.	US Centre Brie (13)	0–1	US Ormesson-sur-Marne (12)
80.	FC Nanteuil-lès-Meaux (14)	0–4	ASF Le Perreux (10)
81.	Mantes City (15)	void (Note: Game void in favour of US Ville d'Avray as Mantes City were penalised in advance by the authorities due to not being up to date with league subscriptions.)	US Ville d'Avray (12)
82.	Stade Vernolitain (13)	1–2	FC Auvers-Ennery (11)
83.	Éragny FC (12)	7–0	US Mauloise (12)
84.	ES St Prix (11)	8–1	CS Achères (12)
85.	Mantes-la-Ville FC (15)	void (Note: Game ruled void in favour of USO Bezons after Mantes-la-Ville FC informed the authorities too late that neither their ground nor their opponents was available on the scheduled date, and therefore a new date could not be scheduled within the deadlines set by the authorities.)	USO Bezons (11)
86.	AS Fontenay-St Père (15)	5–6	JS Pontoisienne (10)
87.	AC Parmain (13)	6–2	ASM Chambourcy (12)
88.	Stade Français (14)	5–1	Olympique Mantes FC (15)
89.	AS Guerville-Arnouville (14)	5–0	FC Franco Turc Cergy-Pontoise (14)
90.	Maisons-Laffitte FC (13)	void (Note: Game void in favour of Maisons-Laffitte FC as Fouilleuse FC were penalised in advance by the authorities due to not being up to date with league subscriptions.)	Fouilleuse FC (14)
91.	AFC St Cyr (13)	1–3	US Ris-Orangis (12)
92.	FC Villemoisson (12)	1–6	US Marly-le-Roi (11)
93.	FC St Vrain (14)	0–6	AS Montigny-le-Bretonneux (10)
94.	ASL Mesnil St Denis (14)	0–2	Saint-Michel-sur-Orge Sports (11)
95.	SC Épinay-sur-Orge (11)	1–3	FC Le Chesnay 78 (10)
96.	CO Villiers (14)	0–9	AS Maurepas (10)
97.	AS Angervilliers (12)	4–5	FC Magny-les-Hameaux 78 (13)
98.	AJ Étampoise (14)	2–5	JSC Pitray-Olier (12)
99.	AC Villenoy (12)	1–6	Stade de l'Est Pavillonnais (10)
100.	GAFE Plessis-Bouchard (13)	0–2	ES Stains (11)
101.	Neuilly-Plaisance Sports (12)	3–7	FC Cosmo 77 (11)
102.	ES Brie Nord (11)	1–4	FC Épinay Athlético (11)
103.	AJ du Pavé Neuf Noisy-le-Grand (13)	9–1	Val de France Foot (10)
104.	SC Dugny (12)	7–4 (a.e.t.)	AS St Mard (12)
105.	AS Éclair de Puiseux (13)	2–1	ES St Pathus Oissery (12)
106.	UF Portugais Meaux (13)	2–3 (a.e.t.)	ASS Noiséenne (12)
107.	Meaux ADOM (11)	5–0	Avenir Survilliers (12)
108.	AS Outre-Mer du Bois l'Abbé (13)	1–3 (Note: US Lagny Messager penalised for fielding a suspended player. AS Outre-Mer du Bois l'Abbé qualify for the second round.)	US Lagny Messagers (11)
109.	FC Brie Est (11)	5–6	ASA Montereau (10)
110.	Champs FC (12)	void (Note: Game void in favour of Villepinte Flamboyants as Champs FC were penalised in advance by the authorities due to not being up to date with league subscriptions.)	Villepinte Flamboyants (10)
111.	SS Voltaire Châtenay-Malabry (11)	4–5	FO Plaisirois (11)
112.	USM Viroflay (15)	3–2	Bondoufle Amical Club (13)
113.	CS Ternes Paris-Oueste (15)	2–3	AS Neuville-sur-Oise (12)
114.	FC Antillais de Vigneux-sur-Seine (13)	2–3	CSM Clamart Foot (11)
115.	USC Mantes (14)	5–0	Paris Alésia FC (11)
116.	Olympique Montigny (11)	3–0	US Chanteloup-les-Vignes (10)
117.	AS Beauchamp (12)	2–3	US Verneuil-sur-Seine (10)
118.	AS Issou (14)	0–5	FC Asnières (12)
119.	ACS Cormeillais (11)	2–1	US Montesson (12)
120.	US Ézanville-Écouen (11)	0–5	US Le Pecq (10)
121.	AS Carrières Grésillons (11)	3–2	ES Frettoise (12)
122.	FC St Germain-en-Laye (14)	3–4	Entente Méry-Mériel Bessancourt (12)
123.	FC Andresy (12)	1–4	FC Rueil Malmaison (10)
124.	US Hardricourt (11)	5–1	Entente Beaumont Mours (12)
125.	Juziers FC (15)	0–2	FC Deuil-Enghien (10)
126.	FCM Garges-Les-Gonesse (10)	1–0	Aubergenville FC (10)
127.	Gargenville Stade (11)	2–0 (a.e.t.)	Argenteuil FC (10)
128.	AS Cheminots Ouest (14)	3–5	FC Magnanville (12)
129.	AS Mesnil-le-Roi (14)	5–2	Olympique Viarmes Asnières-sur-Oise (12)
130.	ESM Thillay-Vaudherland (13)	1–11	Épinay Académie (10)
131.	Soisy-Andilly-Margency FC (12)	4–1	SO Houilles (13)
132.	FC Domont (12)	0–3	Sartrouville FC (11)
133.	AS Victory (14)	void (Note: Game void in favour of Mitry-Mory as AS Victory were penalised in advance by the authorities due to not being up to date with league subscriptions.)	Mitry-Mory (10)
134.	FC Esperanto (14)	1–0	Noisiel FC (11)
135.	Bussy St Georges FC (11)	0–1	ASL Janville Lardy (12)
136.	Courtry Foot (13)	void (Note: Game ruled void in favour of ES Montreuil after Courtry Foot informed the authorities too late that neither their ground nor their opponents was available on the scheduled date, and therefore a new date could not be scheduled within the deadlines set by the authorities.)	ES Montreuil (12)
137.	AS Porte de Bagnolet (14)	void (Note: Game ruled void in favour of AS Chelles after AS Porte de Bagnolet failed to inform the authorities that their ground was unavailable on the scheduled day and failed to attempt to rearrange the game within the defined period.)	AS Chelles (11)
138.	CS Dammartin (11)	2–1	CA Romainville (13)
139.	UMS Pontault-Combault (11)	0–3	CAP Charenton (10)
140.	EPP Gervaisienne (14)	0–5	AS Champs-sur-Marne (10)
141.	AS Le Pin-Villevaude (12)	5–6	Espérance Paris 19ème (11)
142.	St Mandé FC (11)	3–7	St Thibault-des-Vignes FC (11)
143.	Benfica Yerres (14)	4–7	FC Émerainville (12)
144.	AS Collégien (12)	0–2	Viking Club de Paris (13)
145.	AS Arnouville (12)	5–0	Drancy FC (11)
146.	CS Villetaneuse (12)	5–0	ES Jeunes Stade (13)
147.	USM Bruyères-Bernes (12)	2–3 (a.e.t.)	USM Audonienne (11)
148.	Pierrefitte FC (12)	5–0	Fontenay-en-Parisis (12)
149.	AFC Île St Denis (14)	void (Note: Game ruled void in favour of FC Montmorency after AFC Île St Denis informed the authorities too late that neither their ground nor their opponents was available on the scheduled date, and therefore a new date could not be scheduled within the deadlines set by the authorities.)	FC Montmorency (12)
150.	JS Villiers-le-Bel (11)	0–5	FC Solitaires Paris Est (10)
151.	AS Ermont (11)	3–0	LSO Colombes (10)
152.	Assyro Chaldéens Sarcelles (13)	0–5	ASC La Courneuve (11)
153.	CS Berbère (14)	2–2 (2–3 p)	Gonesse RC (11)
154.	Olympique Paris 15 (15)	1–4	Paris Université Club (10)
155.	CO Cachan (10)	0–1	Olympique Neuilly (10)
156.	Parisud FC (15)	void (Note: Game ruled void in favour of FC Boissy after Parisud FC failed to inform the authorities that their ground was unavailable on the scheduled date and failed to attempt to rearrange the game within the defined period.)	FC Boissy (12)
157.	FC Villepinte (10)	5–4	CA L'Haÿ-les-Roses (11)
158.	La Camillienne Sports 12ème (11)	5–6 (a.e.t.)	FC Aulnay (11)
159.	FC Nogent-sur-Marne (11)	2–4	ES Seizième (10)
160.	Élan Chevilly-Larue (14)	0–1	FA Le Raincy (12)
161.	Montreuil Souvenir 93 (14)	0–11	US Villejuif (10)
162.	FC Chaville (14)	3–4	ES Vitry (10)
163.	Bagnolet FC (11)	6–2	Racine Club Asnières-sur-Seine (14)
164.	Perou ASAF (13)	0–4	Nicolaïte Chaillot Paris (10)
165.	Paris Gaels FA (13)	5–0	Enfants de Passy Paris (14)
166.	UJ Boissy (14)	0–5	Paris IFA (14)
167.	Benfica Argoselo Sports Paris (15)	0–7	AS Paris (12)
168.	FC Groslay (11)	2–1	FC Bourget (11)
169.	Salésienne de Paris (11)	5–0	Villeneuve-St Georges FC
170.	Les Petits Pains (14)	5–4	US Villeneuve Ablon (11)
171.	ESC XVème (14)	2–4	Paris SC (14)
172.	Stade Parisien FC (13)	2–5	UF Créteil (12)
173.	Lutetia FC (13)	void (Note: Game ruled void in favour of FC Romainville after Lutetia FC failed to inform the authorities that their ground was unavailable on the scheduled day and failed to attempt to rearrange the game within the defined period.)	FC Romainville (11)
174.	Ménilmontant FC 1871 (13)	2–4	Mimosa Mada-Sport (14)
175.	Gentilly AC (14)	2–1	Guyane FC Paris (14)
176.	COSM Arcueil (13)	1–2	Panamicaine FC (15)
177.	ESC Paris (14)	3–4	AS Grenelle (14)
178.	ES Créteil (14)	void (Note: Game ruled void in favour of Enfants de Gennevilliers after ES Créteil failed to inform the authorities that their ground was unavailable on the scheduled day and failed to attempt to rearrange the game within the defined period.)	Enfants de Gennevilliers (15)
179.	CS Pouchet Paris XVII (13)	5–0	SO Vertois (13)
180.	AS Versailles Jussieu (14)	3–0	CO Othis (11)
181.	AS Sud Essonne (12)	0–1	COM Bagneux (10)
182.	FC Villennes-Orgeval (11)	3–1	JS Bondy (13)
183.	Marocains de Figuig (13)	0–5	AC Paris 15 (11)
184.	FC Portugais US Ris-Orangis (12)	4–3 (a.e.t.)	OFC Pantin (10)
185.	AS Bourg-la-Reine (13)	0–6	US Fontenay-sous-Bois (10)
186.	ES Villiers-sur-Marne (12)	1–2	SO Rosny-sous-Bois (11)
187.	Goellycompans FC (11)	1–6	US Roissy-en-France (11)
188.	AAS Fresnes (13)	3–2	AS Bruyères (14)
189.	OFC Couronnes (12)	2–1	CSA Kremlin-Bicêtre (11)
190.	CO Vigneux (11)	5–4	ES Guyancourt St Quentin-en-Yvelines (10)
191.	Breuillet FC (11)	1–1 (5–6 p)	Voisins FC (12)
192.	AJ Mézières (15)	1–2	FCM Vauréal (12)
193.	AS Ultra Marine Paris (13)	2–0	AS Paris 18è (14)
194.	US Carrières-sur-Seine (13)	3–6	Osny FC (10)
195.	Cosmos St Denis (10)	2–3	US Persan (10)
196.	FC La Plaine de France (12)	1–3	USM Gagny (12)

== Second round ==
These matches are scheduled to be played between 4 June and 27 August 2017. Tiers shown reflect the 2016–17 season.

Second round results: Paris-Île-de-France

Tie no	Home team (tier)	Score	Away team (tier)
1.	AS Carrières Grésillons (11)	0–2	FC Plateau Bréval Longnes (12)
2.	Osny FC (10)	7–3	FC Gournay (12)
3.	USBS Épône (11)	0–2	US Persan (10)
4.	Draveil FC (11)	1–5	US Roissy-en-Brie (10)
5.	ASC Velizy (11)	8–0 (Note: ASC Velizy penalised for fielding a suspended player. Villeneuve-la-Garenne qualify.)	Villeneuve-la-Garenne (11)
6.	Bagnolet FC (11)	2–1	Portugais Pontault-Combault (10)
7.	FC Romainville (11)	4–2	Sèvres FC 92 (11)
8.	FC Morangis-Chilly (7)	3–6 (a.e.t.)	FC Gobelins Paris 13 (6)
9.	US Ville d'Avray (12)	5–5 (4–2 p)	Sevran FC (9)
10.	Mimosa Mada-Sport (14)	5–3	FC Vaujours (13)
11.	CSM Coubron (11)	0–3	FC St Leu (8)
12.	AS Itteville (14)	4–0	AS Outre-Mer du Bois l'Abbé (13)
13.	CSM Puteaux (9)	1–0	Montreuil Red Star (6)
14.	AS Arnouville (12)	0–5	Courbevoie Sports (9)
15.	Gonesse RC (11)	1–4	ES Nanterre (8)
16.	AS Ultra Marine Paris (13)	3–5	USM Villeparisis (9)
17.	COM Bagneux (10)	1–1 (3–4 p)	Le Mée Sports (6)
18.	FC Villennes-Orgeval (11)	0–1	ES Seizième (10)
19.	US Fontenay-sous-Bois (10)	0–2	FC Les Lilas (6)
20.	SO Rosny-sous-Bois (11)	1–8	US Vaires-sur-Marne (9)
21.	US Roissy-en-France (11)	4–1 (Note: Game to be replayed due to the referee not playing extra time when the scores were level after 90 minutes. Original result was 6–6 (4–1 p))	FC Villepinte (10)
22.	AAS Fresnes (13)	10–0	AS Versailles Jussieu (14)
23.	CS Pouchet Paris XVII (13)	5–2	Aresport Stains 93 (14)
24.	Enfants de la Goutte d'Or (11)	4–0	AS Ermont (11)
25.	ES Petit Anges Paris (13)	5–2	Pierrefitte FC (12)
26.	AS Grenelle (14)	1–4	USM Audonienne (11)
27.	Panamicaine FC (15)	3–4	Espérance Paris 19ème (11)
28.	Gentilly AC (14)	1–1 (2–4 p)	CS Villetaneuse (12)
29.	Salésienne de Paris (11)	2–0	Paris SC (14)
30.	Les Petits Pains (14)	2–5	ASC La Courneuve (11)
31.	Paris Gaels FA (13)	0–0 (3–4 p)	FC Groslay (11)
32.	US Saclas-Méréville (13)	3–1	FC Beynes (13)
33.	AS Choisy-le-Roi (9)	0–2	FC Livry-Gargan (8)
34.	Garches Vaucresson FC (15)	1–12	AAS Sarcelles (9)
35.	SCM Châtillonnais (11)	1–3	AC Houilles (9)
36.	St Cloud FC (11)	0–1	OFC Les Mureaux (6)
37.	AS Chatou (8)	1–2 (a.e.t.)	Olympique Adamois (7)
38.	FC Orsay-Bures (11)	0–2	Racing Colombes 92 (6)
39.	Portugais Conflans (14)	1–4	Éragny FC (12)
40.	FC Jouy-le-Moutier (11)	1–2	AC Triel (13)
41.	CSM Rosny-sur-Seine (11)	0–2	RFC Argenteuil (8)
42.	AS Ollainville (12)	0–3	US Palaiseau (9)
43.	ES Parisienne (9)	1–2	FC Écouen (9)
44.	FC Goussainville (9)	1–1 (5–3 p) (Note: FC Goussainville penalised for fielding a suspended player. ES Colombienne qualify for the third round.)	ES Colombienne (8)
45.	TU Verrières-le-Buisson (10)	0–0 (4–5 p)	CA Paris (8)
46.	AS Bois d'Arcy (11)	0–3	St Denis US (7)
47.	US 17 Tournants (14)	1–3	JSC Pitray-Olier (12)
48.	FC Étampes (10)	1–4	FC Plessis-Robinson (7)
49.	Dourdan Sport (11)	2–3 (a.e.t.)	FC Igny (9)
50.	AS Courdimanche (12)	1–2	US Hardricourt (11)
51.	FC Cosmo 77 (11)	4–6	USM Gagny (12)
52.	Brie FC (13)	0–3	AJ du Pavé Neuf Noisy-le-Grand (13)
53.	ES Stains (11)	0–2	FC Franconville (9)
54.	FC Magny-les-Hameaux 78 (13)	5–2	AS Éclair de Puiseux (13)
55.	AS Maurepas (10)	0–4	Sucy FC (7)
56.	FC Le Chesnay 78 (10)	4–3 (a.e.t.)	Cergy Pontoise FC (7)
57.	CO Vigneux (11)	0–6	ES Cesson Vert St Denis (8)
58.	AS Montigny-le-Bretonneux (10)	3–3 (5–4 p)	CSM Gennevilliers (9)
59.	Cosmo Taverny (9)	2–1	Champigny FC 94 (7)
60.	Voisins FC (12)	3–1	USM Malakoff (9)
61.	Stade Français (14)	1–2	Stade de l'Est Pavillonnais (10)
62.	FCM Vauréal (12)	void (Note: Game ruled void in favour of JS Suresnes after FCM Vauréal were penalised in advance due to being in a condition of General Forfeit (forfeiting three or more games during the season).)	JS Suresnes (9)
63.	AC Parmain (13)	2–5	AS Guerville-Arnouville (14)
64.	JS Pontoisienne (10)	6–2	Espérance Aulnay (9)
65.	AGS Essarts-le-Roi (14)	1–5	ES St Prix (11)
66.	FC Auvers-Ennery (11)	2–3	Tremblay FC (8)
67.	ASF Le Perreux (10)	0–2	Blanc Mesnil SF (6)
68.	US Ormesson-sur-Marne (12)	2–4	Saint-Michel-sur-Orge Sports (11)
69.	UF Clichois (10)	1–3	CS Meaux Academy (7)
70.	ES Marly-la-Ville (10)	5–4 (a.e.t.)	CSL Aulnay (7)
71.	FC Antillais Paris 19ème (14)	1–3	US Marly-le-Roi (11)
72.	US Alfortville (9)	2–3	CO Les Ulis (6)
73.	AS Bondy (10)	1–0	AF Garenne-Colombes (6)
74.	USA Clichy (9)	0–5	Conflans FC (8)
75.	FC Maisons Alfort (9)	0–1	US Grigny (9)
76.	US Ris-Orangis (12)	2–6	St Maur VGA (9)
77.	FC Courcouronnes (9)	3–2 (Note: FC Courcouronnes penalised for fielding a suspended player. CO Vincennes qualify.)	CO Vincennes (9)
78.	CSM Bonneuil-sur-Marne (9)	1–3	AS Soisy-sur-Seine (10)
79.	Aigle Fertoise Boissy le Cutté (13)	2–3 (a.e.t.)	FC Nandy (10)
80.	Portugais Académica Champigny (13)	0–3	Grigny FC (14)
81.	FC Ballancourt (12)	2–2 (4–1 p)	ASA Montereau (10)
82.	FC Lissois (11)	5–7 (a.e.t.)	CA Vitry (9)
83.	USD Ferrières-en-Brie (12)	1–4	FC Montfermeil (9)
84.	FC Parisis (9)	5–2	US Torcy (8)
85.	SC Gretz-Tournan (10)	1–2	Villemomble Sports (6)
86.	RCP Fontainebleau (10)	1–6	US Rungis (8)
87.	FC Milly-la-Forêt (13)	2–3	US Ponthierry (10)
88.	FC St Germain-Saintry-St Pierre (11)	5–2 (a.e.t.)	USC Lesigny (11)
89.	CS Mennecy (11)	5–2	ES Nangis (13)
90.	US Vert-le-Grand (13)	4–2	AS Lieusaint (11)
91.	FC Boussy-Quincy (11)	2–2 (8–7 p)	Vaux-le-Pénil La Rochette (11)
92.	Coulommiers Brie (10)	3–3 (5–4 p)	Évry FC (6)
93.	ES Vitry (10)	0–1	AF Bobigny (6)
94.	Olympique Neuilly (10)	2–3	ES Trappes (9)
95.	FC Émerainville (12)	1–0	Paris Université Club (10)
96.	AS Champs-sur-Marne (10)	5–0	Ésperance Provins-Sourdun (9)
97.	US Villejuif (10)	4–1	Nicolaïte Chaillot Paris (10)
98.	Thiais FC (12)	3–5	FC Ozoir-la-Ferrière 77 (9)
99.	FC Aulnay (11)	1–2	St Thibault-des-Vignes FC (11)
100.	CS Dammartin (11)	2–5	ESA Linas-Montlhéry (7)
101.	ASL Janville Lardy (12)	2–2 (1–4 p)	UF Créteil (12)
102.	Sartrouville FC (11)	2–1 (a.e.t.)	Neauphle-le-Château-Pontchartrain RC 78 (7)
103.	Soisy-Andilly-Margency FC (12)	0–5	ALJ Limay (9)
104.	FC Athis Mons (11)	2–5	Val d'Europe FC (8)
105.	FC Brunoy (12)	2–0	FC Melun (7)
106.	OSC Élancourt (12)	1–7	ASA Issy (7)
107.	Villepreux FC (11)	1–3	Montrouge FC 92 (8)
108.	SFC Neuilly-sur-Marne (8)	3–2	Tremplin Foot (9)
109.	FC La Verrière (15)	2–5	Stade Vanve (9)
110.	SFC Bailly Noisy-le-Roi (11)	9–0	Villebon SF (11)
111.	USO Bezons (11)	0–4	Val Yerres Crosne AF (8)
112.	Claye-Souilly SF (9)	1–2	Antony Sports (7)
113.	FC Vallée 78 (11)	0–2	Paray FC (9)
114.	FC Boissy-sous-St Yon (14)	0–5	FC Esperanto (14)
115.	Viking Club de Paris (13)	3–0	AS Paris (12)
116.	AS Saintry (14)	4–2	AS Fontenay-Trésigny (11)
117.	Paris IFA (14)	0–3	CAP Charenton (10)
118.	FC Solitaires Paris Est (10)	3–1 (a.e.t.)	US Lognes (9)
119.	AS Mesnil-le-Roi (14)	1–4	Épinay Académie (10)
120.	FC Magnanville (12)	0–6	FCM Garges-Les-Gonesse (10)
121.	FC Deuil-Enghien (10)	1–1 (4–5 p)	Gargenville Stade (11)
122.	Entente Méry-Mériel Bessancourt (12)	2–5	FC Rueil Malmaison (10)
123.	ACS Cormeillais (11)	2–0	US Le Pecq (10)
124.	US Verneuil-sur-Seine (10)	2–0 (Note: US Verneuil-sur-Seine penalised for fielding a suspended player. FC Asnières qualify for the third round.)	FC Asnières (12)
125.	USC Mantes (14)	0–6	Olympique Montigny (11)
126.	USM Viroflay (15)	0–3	AS Neuville-sur-Oise (12)
127.	FO Plaisirois (11)	3–1	CSM Clamart Foot (11)
128.	ASS Noiséenne (12)	1–10	Meaux ADOM (11)
129.	SC Dugny (12)	0–6	St Brice FC (7)
130.	FC Épinay Athlético (11)	5–0	FC Bry (8)
131.	Cheminots Villeneuve-St Georges (10)	0–4	Issy-les-Moulineaux (6)
132.	FC Chevry Cosigny 77 (13)	0–5	CS Brétigny (7)
133.	USM Verneuil (13)	1–4	CO Savigny (10)
134.	FC Montmorency (12)	0–10	Noisy-le-Grand FC (8)
135.	Maisons-Laffitte FC (13)	3–4	RC Arpajonnais (11)
136.	AS Chelles (11)	1–7	Gatinais Val de Loing (10)
137.	AC Paris 15 (11)	9–0	FC Portugais US Ris-Orangis (12)
138.	Enfants de Gennevilliers (15)	1–5	OFC Couronnes (12)
139.	FC Boissy (12)	2–8	ES Montreuil (12)
140.	Mitry-Mory (10)	3–2	Villepinte Flamboyants (10)
141.	FA Le Raincy (12)	2–3	AJ Limeil-Brévannes (11)

== Third round ==
These matches were played on 10 September 2017.

Third round results: Paris-Île-de-France

Tie no	Home team (tier)	Score	Away team (tier)
1.	AAS Fresnes (12)	0–2	US Roissy-en-France (11)
2.	FC Ozoir-la-Ferrière 77 (9)	2–2 (4–3 p)	FC Livry-Gargan (7)
3.	FC Rueil Malmaison (10)	4–0	US Hardricourt (10)
4.	OFC Couronnes (12)	3–5	ES Seizième (10)
5.	Tremblay FC (9)	0–1	US Sénart-Moissy (5)
6.	Coulommiers Brie (10)	0–6	SFC Neuilly-sur-Marne (8)
7.	Salésienne de Paris (12)	3–1	AS Soisy-sur-Seine (10)
8.	Sucy FC (6)	0–3	FC Gobelins Paris 13 (5)
9.	ES Trappes (9)	1–4	Racing Colombes 92 (5)
10.	Conflans FC (7)	2–0	Courbevoie Sports (8)
11.	St Maur VGA (10)	0–2	FC Parisis (9)
12.	US Marly-le-Roi (11)	1–2	ASA Issy (7)
13.	US Palaiseau (9)	3–0	Meaux ADOM (10)
14.	CS Pouchet Paris XVII (12)	3–1	AS Bondy (10)
15.	AS Montigny-le-Bretonneux (10)	1–4	Le Mée Sports (6)
16.	SFC Bailly Noisy-le-Roi (11)	2–0	Viking Club de Paris (12)
17.	FCM Aubervilliers (5)	5–3	ESA Linas-Montlhéry (6)
18.	ES Montreuil (12)	6–5 (a.e.t.)	US Saclas-Méréville (13)
19.	Éragny FC (11)	1–6	Paray FC (8)
20.	FC Brunoy (10)	2–1	UJA Maccabi Paris Métropole (6)
21.	US Roissy-en-Brie (10)	6–2	AS Saintry (14)
22.	UF Créteil (12)	1–6	ES Marly-la-Ville (9)
23.	US Vaires-sur-Marne (9)	4–3 (a.e.t.)	FC Solitaires Paris Est (10)
24.	USM Audonienne (11)	2–3	JSC Pitray-Olier (11)
25.	FC Plateau Bréval Longnes (12)	3–4 (a.e.t.)	ALJ Limay (8)
26.	ASC La Courneuve (10)	0–0 (Note: FC Le Chesnay 78 penalised for fielding suspended players. ASC La Courneuve qualify. Original scoreline 0–2 (a.e.t.).)	FC Le Chesnay 78 (10)
27.	Bagnolet FC (11)	0–0 (Note: Bagnolet FC penalised for fielding a suspended player. ES Nanterre qualify. Original scoreline 1–0.)	ES Nanterre (7)
28.	FC Esperanto (13)	2–4	Grigny FC (13)
29.	ES St Prix (11)	0–5	Issy-les-Moulineaux (7)
30.	Sartrouville FC (11)	0–1 (a.e.t.)	USM Villeparisis (9)
31.	Olympique Montigny (10)	0–3	OFC Les Mureaux (5)
32.	FC St Germain-Saintry-St Pierre (11)	1–1 (3–1 p)	Antony Sports (7)
33.	AJ du Pavé Neuf Noisy-le-Grand (12)	0–8	St Brice FC (6)
34.	USM Gagny (11)	0–3	CSM Puteaux (10)
35.	US Vert-le-Grand (13)	0–0 (5–4 p)	AS Itteville (14)
36.	ACS Cormeillais (11)	1–2 (a.e.t.)	US Villejuif (9)
37.	FC Épinay Athlético (12)	4–1	US Ponthierry (10)
38.	Gatinais Val de Loing (11)	1–3	CAP Charenton (10)
39.	CS Villetaneuse (12)	3–2	Voisins FC (11)
40.	Gargenville Stade (10)	4–0	CA Paris (9)
41.	FO Plaisirois (11)	0–0 (Note: FO Plaisirois penalised for fielding a suspended player. ES Colombienne qualify. Original scoreline unknown.)	ES Colombienne (8)
42.	FC Franconville (9)	1–6	US Ivry (5)
43.	AJ Limeil-Brévannes (11)	1–2	CA Vitry (9)
44.	FC Boussy-Quincy (11)	0–5	FC Plessis-Robinson (7)
45.	US Grigny (8)	4–3 (a.e.t.)	FC Les Lilas (6)
46.	FC St Leu (7)	3–6 (a.e.t.)	CO Les Ulis (5)
47.	CO Savigny (11)	4–1	Espérance Paris 19ème (11)
48.	Noisy-le-Grand FC (7)	0–1	FC Versailles 78 (5)
49.	FC Émerainville (11)	0–2	FC Écouen (9)
50.	Mimosa Mada-Sport (13)	1–3	Montrouge FC 92 (7)
51.	FC Magny-les-Hameaux 78 (13)	2–6	Blanc Mesnil SF (5)
52.	AS Saint-Ouen-l'Aumône (5)	3–4 (a.e.t.)	US Rungis (6)
53.	FC Ballancourt (13)	1–11	Mitry-Mory (10)
54.	Val d'Europe FC (7)	4–3	RFC Argenteuil (8)
55.	FC Nandy (10)	1–1 (1–3 p)	FC Igny (9)
56.	Stade Vanve (10)	4–1	RC Arpajonnais (11)
57.	AS Guerville-Arnouville (14)	0–4	FC Groslay (10)
58.	Osny FC (10)	0–2	JS Suresnes (9)
59.	Villeneuve-la-Garenne (11)	1–3 (a.e.t.)	AC Houilles (8)
60.	US Persan (10)	5–1	AS Champs-sur-Marne (10)
61.	Saint-Michel-sur-Orge Sports (11)	1–5	Épinay Académie (9)
62.	Enfants de la Goutte d'Or (11)	0–3	CS Meaux Academy (6)
63.	CO Vincennes (8)	3–2	CS Brétigny (6)
64.	FCM Garges-Les-Gonesse (10)	1–0	AF Bobigny (5)
65.	St Thibault-des-Vignes FC (10)	1–4	AS Neuville-sur-Oise (12)
66.	ES Petit Anges Paris (13)	3–0	JS Pontoisienne (11)
67.	Stade de l'Est Pavillonnais (10)	1–2	Val Yerres Crosne AF (8)
68.	FC Romainville (11)	0–0 (3–5 p)	Olympique Adamois (8)
69.	CS Mennecy (11)	0–6	Olympique Noisy-le-Sec (5)
70.	ES Cesson Vert St Denis (8)	4–5	FC Montfermeil (9)
71.	FC Asnières (12)	2–0	US Ville d'Avray (12)
72.	AC Paris 15 (10)	4–0	Cosmo Taverny (9)
73.	St Denis US (7)	2–0	AC Triel (14)
74.	AAS Sarcelles (9)	1–1 (4–5 p)	Villemomble Sports (6)

== Fourth round ==
These matches were played on 23 and 24 September 2017.

Fourth round results: Paris-Île-de-France

Tie no	Home team (tier)	Score	Away team (tier)
1.	FC Plessis-Robinson (7)	1–0	AC Boulogne-Billancourt (4)
2.	ES Petit Anges Paris (13)	0–6	CO Les Ulis (5)
3.	ES Seizième (10)	1–2 (a.e.t.)	Villemomble Sports (6)
4.	Stade Vanve (10)	2–3 (a.e.t.)	FCM Aubervilliers (5)
5.	FC Montfermeil (9)	7–3	FC Asnières (12)
6.	AC Houilles (8)	3–2	CS Meaux Academy (6)
7.	FC St Germain-Saintry-St Pierre (11)	0–1 (a.e.t.)	Paray FC (8)
8.	ES Montreuil (12)	0–6	Olympique Noisy-le-Sec (5)
9.	Val d'Europe FC (7)	1–1 (2–4 p)	Blanc Mesnil SF (5)
10.	FC Rueil Malmaison (10)	0–2	St Brice FC (6)
11.	ASC La Courneuve (10)	7–2 (a.e.t.)	US Vaires-sur-Marne (9)
12.	US Villejuif (9)	1–0	Olympique Adamois (8)
13.	SFC Neuilly-sur-Marne (8)	1–2	Val Yerres Crosne AF (8)
14.	FC Ozoir-la-Ferrière 77 (9)	2–2 (4–2 p)	US Sénart-Moissy (5)
15.	CAP Charenton (10)	0–0 (Note: US Roissy-en-Brie penalised for fielding ineligible players. CAP Charenton qualify. Original scoreline 0–1.)	US Roissy-en-Brie (10)
16.	Mitry-Mory (10)	2–0	JS Suresnes (9)
17.	ASA Issy (7)	2–5	Racing Colombes 92 (5)
18.	US Vert-le-Grand (13)	0–2	FCM Garges-Les-Gonesse (10)
19.	FC Brunoy (10)	2–1	AS Neuville-sur-Oise (12)
20.	FC Parisis (9)	1–0	OFC Les Mureaux (5)
21.	SFC Bailly Noisy-le-Roi (11)	2–1 (a.e.t.)	Conflans FC (7)
22.	US Roissy-en-France (11)	1–5	Gargenville Stade (10)
23.	ES Colombienne (8)	1–0	FC Gobelins Paris 13 (5)
24.	Le Mée Sports (6)	1–3	US Lusitanos Saint-Maur (4)
25.	Épinay Académie (9)	5–7 (a.e.t.)	AS Poissy (4)
26.	US Palaiseau (9)	1–2 (a.e.t.)	FC Mantes (4)
27.	FC Écouen (9)	0–1	St Denis US (7)
28.	USM Villeparisis (9)	0–1	US Ivry (5)
29.	Salésienne de Paris (12)	1–3	FC Fleury 91 (4)
30.	FC Épinay Athlético (12)	1–4	ALJ Limay (8)
31.	Grigny FC (13)	4–3	CSM Puteaux (10)
32.	US Persan (10)	2–0	ES Viry-Châtillon (4)
33.	CO Savigny (11)	3–0	CS Villetaneuse (12)
34.	FC Igny (9)	0–3	FC Versailles 78 (5)
35.	CS Pouchet Paris XVII (12)	0–6	Issy-les-Moulineaux (7)
36.	ES Marly-la-Ville (9)	4–2	FC Groslay (10)
37.	ES Nanterre (7)	1–0	CO Vincennes (8)
38.	JSC Pitray-Olier (11)	1–4	JA Drancy (4)
39.	CA Vitry (9)	2–2 (2–4 p)	Sainte-Geneviève Sports (4)
40.	Montrouge FC 92 (7)	1–4	US Grigny (8)
41.	AC Paris 15 (10)	1–1 (3–4 p)	US Rungis (6)

== Fifth round ==
These matches were played on 7, 8 and 15 October 2017.

Fifth round results: Paris-Île-de-France

Tie no	Home team (tier)	Score	Away team (tier)
1.	Sainte-Geneviève Sports (4)	1–2	US Créteil-Lusitanos (3)
2.	Blanc Mesnil SF (5)	1–1 (4–3 p)	AS Poissy (4)
3.	St Denis US (7)	2–0	Olympique Noisy-le-Sec (5)
4.	FCM Garges-Les-Gonesse (10)	4–2	CO Savigny (11)
5.	FC Montfermeil (9)	0–2	CO Les Ulis (5)
6.	US Persan (10)	1–0	Villemomble Sports (6)
7.	SFC Bailly Noisy-le-Roi (11)	1–2	FCM Aubervilliers (5)
8.	ES Marly-la-Ville (9)	1–1 (4–2 p)	FC Versailles 78 (5)
9.	Val Yerres Crosne AF (8)	0–1	US Lusitanos Saint-Maur (4)
10.	ES Colombienne (8)	1–1 (1–4 p)	FC Plessis-Robinson (7)
11.	Paray FC (8)	2–1 (a.e.t.)	US Villejuif (9)
12.	FC Ozoir-la-Ferrière 77 (9)	0–2	Red Star FC (3)
13.	FC Brunoy (10)	0–2	AC Houilles (8)
14.	FC Parisis (9)	0–6	US Ivry (5)
15.	St Brice FC (6)	2–1	Issy-les-Moulineaux (7)
16.	Racing Colombes 92 (5)	1–0	JA Drancy (4)
17.	Mitry-Mory (10)	2–4	ASC La Courneuve (10)
18.	Gargenville Stade (10)	0–2	US Rungis (6)
19.	ALJ Limay (8)	0–3	FC Fleury 91 (4)
20.	CAP Charenton (10)	1–1 (4–5 p)	L'Entente SSG (3)
21.	Grigny FC (13)	1–6	FC Mantes (4)
22.	US Grigny (8)	5–0	ES Nanterre (7)

== Sixth round ==
These matches were played on 21 and 22 October 2017.

Sixth round results: Paris-Île-de-France

Tie no	Home team (tier)	Score	Away team (tier)
1.	FC Mantes (4)	0–1	Blanc Mesnil SF (5)
2.	Red Star FC (3)	1–1 (3–4 p)	FC Fleury 91 (4)
3.	US Créteil-Lusitanos (3)	0–3	US Lusitanos Saint-Maur (4)
4.	ES Marly-la-Ville (9)	0–2	L'Entente SSG (3)
5.	US Rungis (6)	2–2 (5–4 p)	FC Plessis-Robinson (7)
6.	US Persan (10)	2–4	Racing Colombes 92 (5)
7.	Paray FC (8)	1–5	FCM Aubervilliers (5)
8.	ASC La Courneuve (10)	4–2	US Grigny (8)
9.	US Ivry (5)	3–4	CO Les Ulis (5)
10.	St Brice FC (6)	0–0 (4–3 p)	St Denis US (7)
11.	FCM Garges-Les-Gonesse (10)	1–2	AC Houilles (8)
