= 2016–17 Coupe de France preliminary rounds, Paris-Île-de-France =

The 2016–17 Coupe de France preliminary rounds, Paris-Île-de-France made up the qualifying competition to decide which teams from the Paris and Île-de-France leagues took part in the main competition from round 7. This was the 100th season of the football cup competition of France. The competition was organised by the French Football Federation (FFF) and is open to all clubs in French football, as well as clubs from the overseas departments and territories (Guadeloupe, French Guiana, Martinique, Mayotte, New Caledonia (qualification via 2016 New Caledonia Cup), Tahiti (qualification via 2016 Tahiti Cup), Réunion, and Saint Martin).

The qualifying rounds took place between April and October 2016.

== First round ==
These matches were played between 24 April and 5 May 2016. Note that Tiers refer to the 2015–16 season.

First round results: Île-de-France

Tie no	Home team (tier)	Score	Away team (tier)
1.	FC Provins MJC (10)	2–4	US Grigny (10)
2.	FC Brunoy (12)	4–2	ES Villiers-sur-Marne (12)
3.	SO Houilles (13)	3–6	Villeneuve-la-Garenne (12)
4.	FC Moret-Veneux Sablons (10)	5–3 (a.e.t.)	CO Vigneux (10)
5.	Vaux-le-Pénil La Rochette (11)	1–2	Cheminots Villeneuve-Saint-Georges (11)
6.	FC Magny-les-Hameaux 78 (12)	4–0	FC Nandy (10)
7.	JS Pontoisienne (10)	1–3	La Plaine-Saint-Denis (13)
8.	ES Jeunes Stade (12)	4–0	AS Entente Brie Est La Ferté-Gaucher (12)
9.	Bonnières-sur-Seine Freneuse (14)	3–4	FC Chaville (14)
10.	Viking Club de Paris (14)	0–1	Saint-Michel-sur-Orge Sports (11)
11.	Morsang-sur-Orge FC (14)	2–3	USM Les Clayes-sous-Bois (11)
12.	Briard SC (10)	3–2	Saint-Thibault-des-Vignes FC (11)
13.	Drancy FC (12)	3–0	Gonesse RC (11)
14.	AS Ultra Marine Paris (14)	2–0	AS Paris 18 (14)
15.	ES Frettoise (12)	0–3	US Chanteloup-les-Vignes (10)
16.	ES Magnanville (12)	1–6	FC Saint-Butt (11)
17.	FC Varennes-sur-Seine (13)	1–3	Saint-Germain-lès-Corbeil-Saintry-sur-Seine (11)
18.	Marcoussis Nozay La-Ville-du-Bois FC (11)	1–0	AS Montigny-le-Bretonneux (11)
19.	Villepinte Flamboyants (11)	1–0	Meaux ADOM (11)
20.	Houdanaise Région Orgerus FC (14)	7–2	Parisud Paris FC (15)
21.	CSM Clamart Foot (10)	1–6	FO Plaisirois (11)
22.	AS Vexin (11)	0–3	ALJ Limay (10)
23.	Olympique Viarmes Asnières-sur-Oise (12)	2–4	CO Othis (11)
24.	Bailly Noisy-le-Roi SFC (11)	3–3 (4–2 p)	Inter Massy (14)
25.	US Ézanville-Écouen (11)	4–0	US Carrières-sur-Seine (14)
26.	Gargenville Stade (12)	2–1	FC Jouy-le-Moutier (11)
27.	COM Bagneux (11)	8–2	US Mauloise (12)
28.	AS Paris (11)	7–1	Benfica Argoselo Sports Paris (14)
29.	Conflans-Sainte-Honorine Patronage (15)	2–6	Assyro Chaldéens Sarcelles (13)
30.	Saint-Mandé FC (11)	4–1	US Ris-Orangis (11)
31.	Enfants de Passy Paris (14)	5–2	AS Issou (14)
32.	La Camillienne Sports 12ème (11)	3–1	Nicolaïte Chaillot Paris (10)
33.	Racine Club Asnières-sur-Seine (15)	0–5 (Note: Tie won by means of forfeit.)	US Verneuil-sur-Seine (10)
34.	AJ Antony (12)	2–5	FC Le Chesnay 78 (10)
35.	Portugais Conflans (15)	1–3	FC Groslay (11)
36.	FC Coignières (13)	2–5	Olympique Neuilly (10)
37.	ES Vauxoise (15)	4–4 (4–5 p)	SFC Champagne 95 (13)
38.	Entente Méry-Mériel Bessancourt (12)	0–11	US Marly-le-Roi (10)
39.	AS Éclair de Puiseux (14)	3–2	AS Annet-sur-Marne (10)
40.	AS Ermont (11)	2–1	AS Carrières Grésillons (11)
41.	Fouilleuse FC (14)	5–0	Maison Culturelle des Antoliens FC (13)
42.	ES St Prix (11)	1–2	CS Achères (12)
43.	US Roissy-en-France (11)	1–2	USM Villeparisis (10)
44.	Courtry Foot (14)	4–2	AS Arnouville (12)
45.	Bonneuil-en-France (13)	4–1	AS Breuilloise (13)
46.	Fontenay-en-Parisis (12)	3–6	FC Aulnay (11)
47.	Union Fosses (12)	2–3	SC Dugny (11)
48.	Cosmo Taverny (10)	5–0	US Croissy (13)
49.	ES Moussy-le-Neuf (13)	2–1	FC Puiseux-Louvres (12)
50.	FC Nanteuil-lès-Meaux (14)	0–1	CA Romainville (13)
51.	Aubergenville FC (11)	5–1	ES Seizième (10)
52.	USBS Épône (12)	6–1	LSO Colombes (10)
53.	AS Guerville-Arnouville (15)	2–0	FC Rueil Malmaison (10)
54.	ASF Guitrancourt (14)	1–6	Argenteuil FC (11)
55.	AS Guernoise (15)	1–1 (4–2 p)	USO Bezons (11)
56.	CS Ternes Paris-Oueste (15)	1–3	ES Bouafle-Flins (14)
57.	Enfants de Gennevilliers (15)	0–12	FC Villennes-Orgeval (11)
58.	Bougival (12)	1–4	Salésienne de Paris (12)
59.	AS St Mard (12)	2–0	Avenir Survilliers (13)
60.	ACS Cormeillais (11)	2–3	Sartrouville FC (11)
61.	CO Cheminots Chambly (13)	0–3	Mitry-Mory (11)
62.	AS Mesnil-le-Roi (14)	1–3	AS Beauchamp (11)
63.	Soisy-Andilly-Margency FC (12)	6–0	CS Dammartin (11)
64.	CS Villetaneuse (12)	1–0	FC Auvers-Ennery (11)
65.	AC Triel (13)	1–2	Éragny FC (12)
66.	ES Boissy L'Aillerie (14)	0–5	Olympique Mantes FC (15)
67.	ES St-Pathus Oissery (11)	0–5	ES Marly-la-Ville (10)
68.	AS Courdimanche (12)	2–3	ES Stains (11)
69.	FC Montmorency (12)	4–5	Épinay Académie (10)
70.	Arronville FC (13)	0–2	CSM Rosny-sur-Seine (11)
71.	Pierrefitte FC (12)	1–0	FC Deuil-Enghien (10)
72.	JS Villiers-le-Bel (12)	2–2 (4–3 p)	Espérance Aulnay (10)
73.	Fraternelle Sportive Esbly (13)	0–5	US Persan (10)
74.	Stade Vernolitain (14)	1–2	Olympique Montigny (11)
75.	FC Domont (11)	2–1	OFC Couronnes (12)
76.	USL Presles (13)	3–4	Goellycompans FC (12)
77.	FC Andresy (12)	1–6	Osny FC (10)
78.	AS Le Pin-Villevaude (12)	1–0 (a.e.t.)	USM Bruyères-Bernes (13)
79.	ASC La Courneuve (11)	4–1	AS Menucourt (12)
80.	GAF Plessis-Bouchard (12)	1–2	Marocains de Figuig (13)
81.	Cosmos St Denis (11)	0–2	FCM Garges-Les-Gonesse (10)
82.	Juziers FC (15)	1–1 (4–2 p)	AC Parmain (13)
83.	AS Neuville-sur-Oise (12)	2–2 (5–6 p)	ASM Chambourcy (12)
84.	US Saint Arnoult (14)	2–2 (4–3 p)	AS Meudon (12)
85.	AJ Étampoise (14)	7–3	Ablis FC Sud 78 (15)
86.	FC Rambouillet Yvelines (12)	1–2	FC Étampes (10)
87.	FC Lissois (11)	2–1	AO Buc Foot (11)
88.	RC Arpajonnais (11)	2–0	Paris Alésia FC (11)
89.	Olympique Paris 15 (15)	0–9	Breuillet FC (12)
90.	FC La Verrière (15)	1–4	JSC Pitray-Olier (13)
91.	FC St Vrain (14)	0–3	CA Vitry (10)
92.	TU Verrières-le-Buisson (11)	3–4	FC Vallée 78 (10)
93.	US 17 Tournants (14)	5–0	CO Villiers (14)
94.	AAS Fresnes (14)	2–0	Dourdan Sport (12)
95.	AS Angervilliers (11)	1–7	AS Bois d'Arcy (11)
96.	AS Ballainvilliers (14)	5–0	ASL Mesnil St Denis (13)
97.	Bondoufle Amical Club (13)	1–3	USC Lesigny (11)
98.	Entente du Pays de Limours (12)	2–1	ASA Montereau (11)
99.	ES Nangis (12)	0–3	CS Mennecy (11)
100.	US Grande Paroisse (13)	0–1	FC Portugais US Ris-Orangis (13)
101.	ES Perray (12)	0–3	CA L'Haÿ-les-Roses (11)
102.	Turc FC Montereau (12)	3–1	AS Corbeil-Essonnes (10)
103.	Draveil FC (11)	1–3	E Longueville Ste Colombe St Loup-de-Naud Soisy-Bouy (10)
104.	ASM Jouarre	w/o	FC Intercommunal Loing (10)
105.	UF Portugais Meaux (14)	0–4 (a.e.t.)	USM Verneuil (12)
106.	US Vert-le-Grand (14)	1–2 (a.e.t.)	US Ponthierry (10)
107.	FC Ballancourt (12)	0–5	FC Bois-le-Roi (11)
108.	Amicale Bocage (13)	1–7	FC Milly-la-Forêt (12)
109.	Aigle Fertoise Boissy le Cutté (13)	0–2	US Avonnaise (10)
110.	ES Forêt (13)	0–1	FC Massy 91 (10)
111.	AC Villenoy (13)	5–0	ES Jouy-Yvron (13)
112.	Alliance Brie 77 (13)	0–6	ES Guyancourt St Quentin-en-Yvelines (10)
113.	ES Saint-Germain-Laval (12)	7–1	Benfica Yerres (13)
114.	OC Gif Section Foot (12)	4–0	CS Cellois (11)
115.	FCM Vauréal (12)	2–4	ESC Ecquevilly (12)
116.	Sèvres FC 92 (11)	4–1	US Hardricourt (11)
117.	AS Fontenay-St Père (15)	1–10	AJSC Nanterre (10)
118.	AS Grenelle (15)	1–4	Mantes USC (14)
119.	Entente Beaumont Mours (12)	1–2 (a.e.t.)	USM Audonienne (11)
120.	Paris Gaels FA (14)	5–0	AS Etoile d'Assyrie (13)
121.	AS Bourg-la-Reine (13)	6–1	AS Ollainville (12)
122.	Moncourt-Fromonville (13)	0–11	US Saclas-Méréville (13)
123.	CO Champlan (14)	4–3	Héricy-Vulaines-Samoreau (13)
124.	US Ville d'Avray (13)	6–8	CA Combs-la-Ville (11)
125.	FC Orsay-Bures (11)	2–4 (a.e.t.)	Voisins FC (12)
126.	OSC Élancourt (12)	3–1	FC Trois Vallées (13)
127.	ES Villabé (12)	2–1	US Jouy-en-Josas (12)
128.	AS Bruyères (14)	3–1	AFC St Cyr (13)
129.	SO Vertois (13)	1–3	ASC Velizy (11)
130.	AS Fontenay-le-Fleury (13)	0–5	FC Épinay Athlético (11)
131.	FC Beynes (13)	2–2 (3–2 p)	JS Longjumelloise (11)
132.	AGS Essarts-le-Roi (15)	0–3	AS Fontenay-aux-Roses (12)
133.	US Yvelines (13)	1–2	ES Petit Anges Paris (13)
134.	AS Versailles Jussieu (15)	4–2	Phare Sportive Zarzissien (13)
135.	AS Sud Essonne (11)	0–1 (Note: Result reversed. AS Sud Essonne progressed to Second Round)	Gatinais Val de Loing (11)
136.	CO Cachan (11)	3–1	AS Soisy-sur-Seine (11)
137.	ASL Janville Lardy (12)	2–3	AJ Limeil-Brévannes (11)
138.	FC Villemoisson (13)	0–1	US Ormesson-sur-Marne (11)
139.	FC Boissy-sous-St Yon (14)	0–1	US Villejuif (10)
140.	FC Longjumeau (11)	2–0	AS Lieusaint (11)
141.	AS Chelles (11)	0–1	FC Nogent-sur-Marne (10)
142.	USD Ferrières-en-Brie (12)	4–0	RC Joinville (11)
143.	ASF Le Perreux (10)	2–2 (3–1 p)	US Quincy-Voisins FC (10)
144.	UMS Pontault-Combault (12)	5–0	FC Marolles (13)
145.	UJ Boissy (13)	0–5	AS Fontenay-Trésigny (11)
146.	FC Vaujours (13)	2–3	ASM Ferté-sous-Jouarre (11)
147.	USF Trilport (11)	1–2	OFC Pantin (10)
148.	Neuilly-Plaisance Sports (13)	0–2	AS Champs-sur-Marne (10)
149.	USM Gagny (13)	4–3	CS Mouroux (14)
150.	US Petit Morin (14)	0–5	SO Rosny-sous-Bois (11)
151.	CSM Coubron (11)	0–1	SC Gretz-Tournan (11)
152.	FC Garches Vaucresson (15)	1–5	FC Bréval-Longnes (13)
153.	FC Boissy (12)	2–3	US Roissy-en-Brie (10)
154.	SO Rozay-en-Brie (13)	1–2	US Villeneuve Ablon (11)
155.	AS Neufmoutiers Villeneuve	0–5	US Chaumes-Gignes (11)
156.	FC Chevry Cossigny 77 (13)	7–4 (a.e.t.)	AS Couilly-St Germain (12)
157.	CAP Charenton (10)	3–2	AS Choisy-en-Brie (10)
158.	FC Bourget (11)	7–1	FC La Plaine de France (11)
159.	AS Croissy-Beaubourg (13)	0–5	FC Maisons Alfort (10)
160.	FC Émerainville (13)	1–7	US Fontenay-sous-Bois (10)
161.	A Portugais Académica Champigny (13)	1–2 (a.e.t.)	Portugais Pontault-Combault (10)
162.	ES Montreuil (12)	5–0	AS Collégien (11)
163.	Entente Sportive Créteil (13)	1–7	Bussy St Georges FC (11)
164.	Thiais FC (12)	3–2	Noisiel FC (11)
165.	UF Pommeuse-Farmoutiers (13)	0–4	UF Créteil (13)
166.	Stade de l'Est Pavillonnais (10)	6–2	Pays Créçois FC (11)
167.	FA Le Raincy (12)	1–2	Magny-le-Hongre FC (11)
168.	FC Montry-Condé (13)	1–2	FC Romainville (11)
169.	SC Bagnolet (13)	1–3 (a.e.t.)	Coulommiers Brie (10)
170.	US Lagny Messagers (11)	2–0	AJ du Pavé Neuf Noisy-le-Grand (13)
171.	AS Varreddes (14)	0–3	JS Bondy (12)
172.	ASS Noiséenne (13)	0–5	Val de France Foot (10)
173.	AJN Bagnolet (11)	2–0	FC Ozoir-la-Ferrière 77 (10)
174.	FC Gournay (13)	12–0	FC Brie-des-Morin (13)
175.	Champs FC (13)	1–5	Paris Université Club (11)
176.	Brie FC (14)	1–2	Espérance Paris 19ème (11)
177.	AS Outre-Mer du Bois l'Abbé (14)	5–0	CA Lizéen
178.	ES Caudacienne (12)	3–4 (a.e.t.)	AS Bondy (10)
179.	FC Boussy-St Antoine (12)	3–4	ES Vitry (10)
180.	Stade Parisien FC (12)	5–0	CSA Kremlin-Bicêtre (11)
181.	COSM Arcueil (14)	2–0	Ménilmontant FC 1871 (14)
182.	ASPTT Gentilly (14)	1–0	Villebon Sport Football (11)
183.	Lutetia FC (14)	0–9	UF Clichois (10)
184.	AP Sainte-Mélanie (13)	1–0	SC Épinay-sur-Orge (11)
185.	ES Montgeron (10)	3–0	Mimosa Mada-Sport (13)
186.	SCM Châtillonnais (12)	8–1	ES Plateau de Saclay (13)
187.	FC Athis Mons (11)	3–2	AS Maurepas (10)
188.	ESC XVème (14)	0–3	Villepreux FC (11)
189.	FC Antillais de Vigneux-sur-Seine (14)	1–2	RC Pays de Fontainebleau (10)
190.	FC Montfort L'Amaury-Yvelines	0–5	SS Voltaire Châtenay-Malabry (11)
191.	US Montesson (13)	0–1	Enfants de la Goutte d'Or (12)
192.	FC St Germain-en-Laye (15)	2–5	FC Asnières (12)
193.	FC Wiener (15)	w/o	Footballeurs???
194.	FC Antillais Paris 19ème (14)	1–7	Stade Vanves (10)
195.	AS Cheminots Ouest (15)	5–0	CMS de Pantin (11)
196.	Panamicaine FC (15)	3–4	OMJ Aubervilliers (14)
197.	Guyane FC Paris (14)	2–4	FC Solitaires Paris Est (10)
198.	RC Paris Nord (14)	0–5	Travailleurs Maghrébins (15)
199.	Les Petits Pains (15)	2–3	Maisons-Laffitte FC (13)
200.	AC Paris 15 (12)	4–0	FC Wissous (11)
201.	Sport Pars Benfica (15)	3–4	Étoile FC Bobigny (13)
202.	CS Pouchet Paris XVII (14)	5–0	ESC Paris (14)

== Second round ==
These matches were scheduled between 22 May and 31 August 2016. Note that Tiers refer to the 2015–16 season.

Second round results: Île-de-France

Tie no	Home team (tier)	Score	Away team (tier)
1.	Enfants de la Goutte d'Or (12)	3–0	Sartrouville FC (11)
2.	US Roissy-en-Brie (10)	5–3	CO Vincennes (9)
3.	Issy-les-Moulineaux (7)	6–1	US 17 Tournants (14)
4.	US Grigny (10)	4–1	Antony Sports (7)
5.	FC Villepinte (9)	0–2	Olympique Adamois (7)
6.	Pierrefitte FC (12)	5–8 (a.e.t.)	US Persan (10)
7.	FC Gournay (13)	2–1	Bussy St Georges FC (11)
8.	ALJ Limay (10)	0–1	ASA Issy (7)
9.	AS Fontenay-Trésigny (11)	1–4	AS Val de Fontenay (9)
10.	Sevran FC (9)	3–1 (a.e.t.)	CS Meaux Academy (7)
11.	US Ézanville-Écouen (11)	0–1	Claye-Souilly SF (9)
12.	Saint-Michel-sur-Orge Sports (11)	2–4	CSM Bonneuil-sur-Marne (9)
13.	OFC Pantin (10)	2–2 (3–4 p)	FC Plessis-Robinson (7)
14.	AJ Étampoise (14)	3–2	US Villeneuve Ablon (11)
15.	Paray FC (9)	0–1	ES Colombienne (8)
16.	CA Combs-la-Ville (11)	2–5	US Palaiseau (9)
17.	ASM Ferté-sous-Jouarre (11)	3–1	Espérance Paris 19ème (11)
18.	ASC La Courneuve (11)	0–5	Saint-Brice FC (7)
19.	Olympique Montigny (11)	1–0	Drancy FC (12)
20.	Travailleurs Maghrébins (15)	0–0 (Note: Travailleurs Maghrébins penalised and removed from the competition. ES Montreuil progress to the Third Round.)	ES Montreuil (12)
21.	FC Intercommunal Loing (10)	4–2	CO Savigny (9)
22.	JS Bondy (12)	1–2	USA Clichy (9)
23.	Breuillet FC (12)	2–1	Saint-Denis US (7)
24.	FC Portugais US Ris-Orangis (13)	8–2	FC Chevry Cossigny 77 (13)
25.	FC Bois-le-Roi (11)	1–4	CS Bretigny (7)
26.	US Ponthierry (10)	4–2	Val Yerres Crosne AF (7)
27.	USC Lesigny (11)	1–5	AJ Limeil-Brévannes (11)
28.	Bonneuil-en-France (13)	– (Note: Both sides penalised, neither progressed)	ES Moussy-le-Neuf (13)
29.	AS St Mard (12)	7–0	Stade Parisien FC (12)
30.	FC Montfermeil (9)	3–1	Stade Vanve (10)
31.	FC Maisons Alfort (10)	4–0	Entente Bagneaux Nemours Saint-Pierre (10)
32.	FC Courcouronnes (9)	0–3	US Rungis (8)
33.	SFC Champagne 95 (13)	5–0	Paris Gaels FA (14)
34.	ES Vitry (10)	4–2	AS Sud Essonne (11)
35.	Mitry-Mory (11)	8–2	JS Villiers-le-Bel (12)
36.	UF Clichois (10)	4–0	US Lagny Messagers (11)
37.	CS Villetaneuse (12)	2–1	ES Jeunes Stade (12)
38.	Étoile FC Bobigny (13)	3–6 (a.e.t.)	AS Ultra Marine Paris (14)
39.	AS Ermont (11)	0–2	ES Nanterre (8)
40.	RCP Fontainebleau (10)	0–3	Tremplin Foot (9)
41.	Cosmo Taverny (10)	5–1	Conflans FC (7)
42.	Voisins FC (12)	4–2 (a.e.t.)	FC Saint-Butt (11)
43.	Goellycompans FC (12)	2–6	Paris Université Club (11)
44.	Soisy-Andilly-Margency FC (12)	1–4	SO Rosny-sous-Bois (11)
45.	FC Nogent-sur-Marne (10)	1–4 (a.e.t.)	Évry FC (6)
46.	FC Solitaires Paris Est (10)	1–0	Portugais Pontault-Combault (10)
47.	ASF Le Perreux (10)	2–2 (3–4 p)	Coulommiers Brie (10)
48.	AS Paris (11)	0–5	ES Guyancourt St Quentin-en-Yvelines (10)
49.	USM Audonienne (11)	0–1	RFC Argenteuil (9)
50.	Épinay Académie (10)	3–1	AAS Sarcelles (9)
51.	USM Villeparisis (10)	0–1	FC St Leu (9)
52.	US Verneuil-sur-Seine (10)	3–1 (a.e.t.)	CSM Puteaux (9)
53.	AS Outre-Mer du Bois l'Abbé (14)	4–6	FC Massy 91 (10)
54.	US Marly-le-Roi (10)	4–3	FC Écouen (9)
55.	SS Voltaire Châtenay-Malabry (11)	1–2	US Chanteloup-les-Vignes (10)
56.	AS Cheminots Ouest (15)	5–2	FC Groslay (11)
57.	USD Ferrières-en-Brie (12)	2–8	US Villejuif (10)
58.	CA Paris (8)	4–1	ES Montgeron (10)
59.	OC Gif Section Foot (12)	2–2 (2–4 p)	FC Vallée 78 (10)
60.	US Fontenay-sous-Bois (10)	4–4 (4–2 p)	ES Cesson Vert St Denis (8)
61.	Villeneuve-la-Garenne (12)	2–1	FC Porcheville (PH)
62.	US Ormesson-sur-Marne (11)	1–2	AS Champs-sur-Marne (10)
63.	Villepinte Flamboyants (11)	0–1	US Vaires-sur-Marne (9)
64.	Courtry Foot (14)	1–3	ES Stains (11)
65.	FC Athis Mons (11)	1–1 (4–2 p)	Briard SC (10)
66.	CA L'Haÿ-les-Roses (11)	1–4	FC Romainville (11)
67.	USM Les Clayes-sous-Bois (11)	4–4 (2–4 p)	Montrouge FC 92 (8)
68.	Thiais FC (12)	3–5	US Lognes (9)
69.	OSC Élancourt (12)	1–8	USM Malakoff (9)
70.	ASC Velizy (11)	2–0 (a.e.t.)	FC Longjumeau (11)
71.	Saint-Mandé FC (11)	0–1	AS Bondy (10)
72.	AS Guerville-Arnouville (15)	0–7	Osny FC (10)
73.	E Longueville Ste Colombe St Loup-de-Naud Soisy-Bouy (10)	0–0 (4–3 p)	Marcoussis Nozay La-Ville-du-Bois FC (11)
74.	FC Aulnay (11)	0–3	FC Goussainville (8)
75.	CS Mennecy (11)	0–3	St Maur VGA (8)
76.	CAP Charenton (10)	8–0	CO Champlan (14)
77.	AS Fontenay-aux-Roses (12)	3–9	Noisy-le-Grand FC (8)
78.	Magny-le-Hongre FC (11)	2–3 (a.e.t.)	FC Les Lilas (6)
79.	Salésienne de Paris (12)	5–1	Villepreux FC (11)
80.	ES Petit Anges Paris (13)	5–4	Bailly Noisy-le-Roi SFC (11)
81.	UMS Pontault-Combault (12)	1–7	FC Livry-Gargan (8)
82.	SC Dugny (11)	1–0 (a.e.t.)	Cheminots Villeneuve-Saint-Georges (11)
83.	La Camillienne Sports 12ème (11)	4–1	FC Brunoy (12)
84.	US Chaumes-Gignes (11)	0–5	FC Bry (8)
85.	Aubergenville FC (11)	1–3	Cergy Pontoise FC (7)
86.	FC Magny-les-Hameaux 78 (12)	1–3	Olympique Neuilly (10)
87.	AS Guernoise (15)	2–5	FC Asnières (12)
88.	CO Othis (11)	3–7	AF Bobigny (6)
89.	ASM Chambourcy (12)	5–1	Marocains de Figuig (13)
90.	JSC Pitray-Olier (13)	2–0 (a.e.t.)	FO Plaisirois (11)
91.	Juziers FC (15)	0–3	FCM Garges-Les-Gonesse (10)
92.	Houdanaise Région Orgerus FC (14)	2–3	Saint-Germain-lès-Corbeil-Saintry-sur-Seine (11)
93.	COSM Arcueil (14)	5–5 (3–2 p)	AS Versailles Jussieu (15)
94.	Maisons-Laffitte FC (13)	2–5	CSM Gennevilliers (9)
95.	UF Créteil (13)	0–3 (Note: AJN Bagnolet merged with SC Bagnolet in July to form Bagnolet FC who took the place in the competition.)	AJN Bagnolet (11)
96.	ASPTT Gentilly (14)	0–5	Entente du Pays de Limours (12)
97.	FC Franconville (9)	0–6	Villemomble Sports (6)
98.	Stade de l'Est Pavillonnais (10)	1–4	AF Garenne-Colombes (6)
99.	CO Cachan (11)	3–4 (a.e.t.)	FC Versailles 78 (6)
100.	FC Bourget (11)	3–1	AJSC Nanterre (10)
101.	US Saclas-Méréville (13)	0–6	SCM Châtillonnais (12)
102.	USM Gagny (13)	1–3	Champigny FC 94 (7)
103.	AAS Fresnes (14)	2–3	US Le Pecq (9)
104.	OMJ Aubervilliers (14)	5–0	AP Sainte-Mélanie (13)
105.	FC Étampes (10)	5–0	FC Beynes (13)
106.	AS Le Pin-Villevaude (12)	0–4	AC Paris 15 (12)
107.	CA Vitry (10)	2–0	AS Chatou (8)
108.	Courbevoie Sports (9)	0–2 (a.e.t.)	FC Gobelins (DH)
109.	Argenteuil FC (11)	0–2	Neauphle-le-Château-Pontchartrain RC 78 (7)
110.	US Torcy (8)	2–0	FC Melun (DH)
111.	US Avonnaise (10)	1–1 (2–1 p)	FC Morangis-Chilly (7)
112.	FC Bréval-Longnes (13)	–	Enfants de Passy Paris (14)
113.	CA Romainville (13)	2–1	AC Villenoy (13)
114.	AS Ballainvilliers (14)	1–1 (4–2 p)	AS Bourg-la-Reine (13)
115.	USM Verneuil (12)	2–8	CO Ulis (6)
116.	AS Beauchamp (11)	1–2	FC Villennes-Orgeval (11)
117.	Fouilleuse FC (14)	1–2	Mantes USC (14)
118.	CS Achères (12)	4–1	Assyro Chaldéens Sarcelles (13)
119.	AS Éclair de Puiseux (14)	1–5	Gargenville Stade (12)
120.	AC Houilles (9)	0–1 (a.e.t.)	ES Parisienne (9)
121.	Val d'Europe FC (9)	6–2	Savigny-le-Temple FC (9)
122.	ES Trappes (9)	3–1	Racing Colombes 92 (6)
123.	Val de France Foot (10)	1–2	SFC Neuill-sur-Marne (8)
124.	FC Épinay Athlético (11)	0–1	US Alfortville (9)
125.	AS Bruyères (14)	1–5	COM Bagneux (11)
126.	ES Saint-Germain-Laval (12)	3–1	ES Villabé (12)
127.	FC Parisis (9)	2–5	AS Choisy-le-Roi (8)
128.	AS Bois d'Arcy (11)	1–5	JS Suresnes (9)
129.	RC Arpajonnais (11)	3–0	US Saint Arnoult (14)
130.	FC Milly-la-Forêt (12)	5–0	Turc FC Montereau (12)
131.	Sucy FC (8)	1–2	ESA Linas-Montlhéry (7)
132.	CSM Rosny-sur-Seine (11)	2–4	Sèvres FC 92 (11)
133.	La Plaine-Saint-Denis (13)	w/o	ES Marly-la-Ville (10)
134.	FC Chaville (14)	w/o	Olympique Mantes FC (15)
135.	ES Bouafle-Flins (14)	3–2	FC Wiener (15)
136.	Éragny FC (12)	11–3	ESC Ecquevilly (12)
137.	CS Pouchet Paris XVII (14)	1–3 (a.e.t.)	USBS Épône (12)
138.	FC Igny (9)	0–5	Le Mée Sports (7)
139.	FC Domont (11)	0–5	Blanc Mesnil SF (6)
140.	SC Gretz-Tournan (11)	1–0	CSL Aulnay (7)
141.	FC Le Chesnay 78 (10)	1–1 (3–0 p)	Montreuil Red Star (6)
142.	FC Moret-Veneux Sablons (10)	1–4	FC Lissois (11)

== Third round ==
These matches were played on 11 September 2016.

Third round results: Île-de-France

Tie no	Home team (tier)	Score	Away team (tier)
1.	FC Villennes-Orgeval (11)	2–3	UF Clichois (10)
2.	US Rungis (8)	1–2	FC Gobelins (6)
3.	ASM Chambourcy (12)	0–3	ES Vitry (10)
4.	Breuillet FC (11)	0–2	AS Val de Fontenay (9)
5.	Sèvres FC 92 (11)	1–4	Olympique Noisy-le-Sec (5)
6.	FC Milly-la-Forêt (13)	0–8	Champigny FC 94 (7)
7.	US Marly-le-Roi (11)	1–9	FCM Aubervilliers (5)
8.	Le Mée Sports (6)	3–0	ESA Linas-Montlhéry (7)
9.	US Chanteloup-les-Vignes (10)	2–5	CO Les Ulis (6)
10.	ES Guyancourt St Quentin-en-Yvelines (10)	1–0	US Persan (10)
11.	CS Achères (12)	0–6	US Torcy-Val-Maubuée (8)
12.	RC Arpajonnais (11)	5–1	JSC Pitray-Olier (12)
13.	AS Cheminots Ouest (14)	3–4	ES Stains (11)
14.	Gargenville Stade (11)	8–3	Éragny FC (12)
15.	ASA Issy (7)	3–2	SFC Neuilly-sur-Marne (8)
16.	Claye-Souilly SF (9)	3–2	AF Garenne-Colombes (6)
17.	US Le Pecq (10)	0–3	US Ivry (5)
18.	FC Montfermeil (9)	3–2	FC Plessis-Robinson (7)
19.	FC Le Chesnay 78 (10)	2–3	Issy-les-Moulineaux (6)
20.	Tremplin Foot (9)	5–3	US Avonnaise (10)
21.	FC Vallée 78 (11)	0–2	ES Colombienne (8)
22.	Cosmo Taverny (9)	4–1	Sevran FC (9)
23.	USM Malakoff (9)	1–0 (a.e.t.)	US Roissy-en-Brie (10)
24.	AS St Mard (11)	1–4	Salésienne de Paris (11)
25.	La Camillienne Sports 12ème (11)	0–5	US Alfortville (9)
26.	FC Gournay (12)	1–4	JS Suresnes (9)
27.	Épinay Académie (10)	0–1	AS Saint-Ouen-l'Aumône (5)
28.	Enfants de la Goutte d'Or (11)	1–3	Mitry-Mory (10)
29.	FC Chaville (14)	0–7	US Grigny (9)
30.	Noisy-le-Grand FC (8)	1–1 (4–2 p)	CS Bretigny (7)
31.	FC Intercommunal Loing (11)	0–3	Val d'Europe FC (8)
32.	CAP Charenton (10)	5–2	FC Étampes (10)
33.	ES Bouafle-Flins (14)	1–4	ASC Velizy (11)
34.	ASM Ferté-sous-Jouarre (11)	2–4	SC Gretz-Tournan (10)
35.	SO Rosny-sous-Bois (11)	7–3	ES Saint-Germain-Laval (11)
36.	Voisins FC (11)	1–3	FC Livry-Gargan (8)
37.	CSM Gennevilliers (9)	0–4	UJA Maccabi Paris Métropole (5)
38.	Montrouge FC 92 (8)	1–0	Neauphle-le-Château-Pontchartrain RC 78 (7)
39.	US Ponthierry (10)	0–1	FC Maisons Alfort (9)
40.	AJ Limeil-Brévannes (11)	1–2	FC St Leu (8)
41.	US Palaiseau (9)	0–6	OFC Les Mureaux (6)
42.	SCM Châtillonnais (11)	5–1	Entente du Pays de Limours (12)
43.	AS Ultra Marine Paris (13)	2–1	FC Romainville (11)
44.	AS Champs-sur-Marne (10)	1–4	US Sénart-Moissy (5)
45.	CS Villetaneuse (12)	0–2 (a.e.t.)	Villeneuve-la-Garenne (11)
46.	CA Romainville (13)	1–2	FC Bourget (11)
47.	FCM Garges-Les-Gonesse (10)	3–2	ES Marly-la-Ville (10)
48.	US Vaires-sur-Marne (9)	2–1	Coulommiers Brie (10)
49.	ES Petit Anges Paris (13)	5–5 (3–2 p)	AC Paris 15 (11)
50.	ES Montreuil (12)	(Note: Match awarded to CA Vitry by FFF after the original game could not be played due to lack of lines on the ES Montreuil pitch)	CA Vitry (9)
51.	CSM Bonneuil-sur-Marne (9)	2–2 (4–3 p)	E Longueville Ste Colombe St Loup-de-Naud Soisy-Bouy (10)
52.	COM Bagneux (10)	1–0	FC Goussainville (9)
53.	Mantes USC (14)	1–1 (4–2 p)	SC Dugny (12)
54.	SFC Champagne 95 (13)	1–8	FC Les Lilas (6)
55.	COSM Arcueil (13)	2–2 (4–5 p)	FC Athis Mons (11)
56.	AS Ballainvilliers (13)	0–11	AF Bobigny (6)
57.	St Maur VGA (9)	1–2	USA Clichy (9)
58.	ES Parisienne (9)	7–0	US Verneuil-sur-Seine (10)
59.	US Lognes (9)	3–4 (a.e.t.)	Évry FC (6)
60.	AJ Étampoise (14)	2–4 (a.e.t.)	FC Asnières (12)
61.	Saint-Brice FC (7)	6–0	ES Nanterre (8)
62.	Saint-Germain-lès-Corbeil-Saintry-sur-Seine (11)	1–3	FC Versailles 78 (6)
63.	Cergy Pontoise FC (7)	1–3	RFC Argenteuil (8)
64.	FC Portugais US Ris-Orangis (12)	2–2 (2–4 p)	FC Solitaires Paris Est (10)
65.	Paris Université Club (10)	1–2	FC Bry (8)
66.	AS Choisy-le-Roi (9)	0–1	ES Trappes (9)
67.	FC Lissois (11)	1–5	Osny FC (10)
68.	US Fontenay-sous-Bois (10)	0–1	Blanc Mesnil SF (6)
69.	US Villejuif (10)	1–2	Olympique Adamois (7)
70.	CA Paris (8)	3–0 (Note: Tie won by means of forfeit.)	OMJ Aubervilliers
71.	FC Massy 91 (11)	2–3	AS Bondy (10)
72.	Olympique Neuilly (10)	1–2	Sainte-Geneviève Sports (5)

== Fourth round ==
These matches were played on 24 and 25 September 2016.

Fourth round results: Île-de-France

Tie no	Home team (tier)	Score	Away team (tier)
1.	FC Versailles 78 (6)	4–0	US Lusitanos Saint-Maur (4)
2.	Issy-les-Moulineaux (6)	0–1	UJA Maccabi Paris Métropole (5)
3.	US Torcy-Val-Maubuée (8)	0–2	USM Malakoff (9)
4.	RC Arpajonnais (11)	4–2	USA Clichy (9)
5.	FC Bourget (11)	3–4 (a.e.t.)	Olympique Adamois (7)
6.	ES Guyancourt St Quentin-en-Yvelines (10)	0–1	JA Drancy (4)
7.	ASA Issy (7)	3–1	AS Saint-Ouen-l'Aumône (5)
8.	FC Livry-Gargan (8)	2–4	AF Bobigny (6)
9.	Cosmo Taverny (9)	2–1 (a.e.t.)	Évry FC (6)
10.	AS Bondy (10)	1–2	Saint-Brice FC (7)
11.	ES Trappes (9)	2–2 (5–4 p)	CA Paris (8)
12.	US Grigny (9)	3–1	Osny FC (10)
13.	FCM Garges-Les-Gonesse (10)	1–4	OFC Les Mureaux (6)
14.	Mitry-Mory (10)	5–4	CSM Bonneuil-sur-Marne (9)
15.	CO Les Ulis (6)	0–2	Entente SSG (4)
16.	Mantes USC (14)	0–5	FC St Leu (8)
17.	SO Rosny-sous-Bois (11)	2–8	FC Fleury 91 (4)
18.	Noisy-le-Grand FC (8)	1–0 (a.e.t.)	US Ivry (5)
19.	USBS Épône (12)	0–4	Tremplin Foot (9)
20.	US Vaires-sur-Marne (9)	3–0	CAP Charenton (10)
21.	Bagnolet FC (11)	3–2	FC Les Lilas (6)
22.	COM Bagneux (10)	0–1 (a.e.t.)	Sainte-Geneviève Sports (5)
23.	Gargenville Stade (11)	2–7	US Sénart-Moissy (5)
24.	FC Maisons Alfort (9)	4–1	ES Stains (11)
25.	FC Solitaires Paris Est (10)	2–1	SCM Châtillonnais (11)
26.	FC Montfermeil (9)	0–3	Olympique Noisy-le-Sec (5)
27.	ASC Velizy (11)	1–6	Champigny FC 94 (7)
28.	JS Suresnes (9)	1–1 (3–2 p)	AC Boulogne-Billancourt (4)
29.	ES Petit Anges Paris (13)	0–7	Le Mée Sports (6)
30.	Villemomble Sports (6)	1–4	FCM Aubervilliers (5)
31.	RFC Argenteuil (8)	0–1	FC Gobelins (6)
32.	US Alfortville (9)	2–0	AS Val de Fontenay (9)
33.	Olympique Montigny (11)	0–2	AS Ultra Marine Paris (13)
34.	FC Athis Mons (11)	0–9	AS Poissy (4)
35.	SC Gretz-Tournan (10)	0–1	CA Vitry (9)
36.	ES Colombienne (8)	0–1	Claye-Souilly SF (9)
37.	FC Bry (8)	2–5	Val d'Europe FC (8)
38.	UF Clichois (10)	1–2	Montrouge FC 92 (8)
39.	FC Asnières (12)	0–5	Blanc Mesnil SF (6)
40.	Salésienne de Paris (11)	0–4	FC Mantes (4)
41.	Villeneuve-la-Garenne (11)	1–4	ES Viry-Châtillon (4)
42.	ES Vitry (10)	0–1	ES Parisienne (9)

== Fifth round ==
These matches were played on 8 and 9 October 2016 with the remaining fixtures scheduled for 16 October 2016.

Fifth round results: Île-de-France

Tie no	Home team (tier)	Score	Away team (tier)
1.	FCM Aubervilliers (5)	1–1 (7–6 p)	Entente SSG (4)
2.	FC Mantes (4)	2–0	Olympique Noisy-le-Sec (5)
3.	US Grigny (9)	0–2 (a.e.t.)	Sainte-Geneviève Sports (5)
4.	Cosmo Taverny (9)	1–3	ES Viry-Châtillon (4)
5.	Olympique Adamois (7)	1–2	US Sénart-Moissy (5)
6.	Claye-Souilly SF (9)	4–1	UJA Maccabi Paris Métropole (5)
7.	FC Maisons Alfort (9)	0–9	FC Fleury 91 (4)
8.	Bagnolet FC (11)	1–1 (4–5 p)	JS Suresnes (9)
9.	US Alfortville (9)	1–2	AS Poissy (4)
10.	FC St Leu (8)	2–3	Champigny FC 94 (7)
11.	US Vaires-sur-Marne (9)	0–2	JA Drancy (4)
12.	FC Solitaires Paris Est (10)	0–2	US Créteil-Lusitanos (3)
13.	Mitry-Mory (10)	1–2	Saint-Brice FC (7)
14.	Val d'Europe FC (8)	0–7	Paris FC (3)
15.	ES Parisienne (9)	1–0	ASA Issy (7)
16.	RC Arpajonnais (11)	1–2 (a.e.t.)	Noisy-le-Grand FC (8)
17.	Montrouge FC 92 (8)	1–2 (a.e.t.)	CA Vitry (9)
18.	ES Trappes (9)	1–2	OFC Les Mureaux (6)
19.	Tremplin Foot (9)	1–2	Le Mée Sports (6)
20.	AF Bobigny (6)	0–0 (5–4 p)	FC Gobelins (6)
21.	FC Versailles 78 (6)	8–0	AS Ultra Marine Paris (13)
22.	USM Malakoff (9)	1–4	Blanc Mesnil SF (6)
