= 2022–23 Coupe de France preliminary rounds, Paris-Île-de-France =

The 2022–23 Coupe de France preliminary rounds, Paris-Île-de-France is the qualifying competition to decide which teams from the leagues of the Paris-Île-de-France region of France take part in the main competition from the seventh round.

A total of ten teams will progress from the Paris-Île-de-France preliminary rounds.

In 2021–22, Championnat National 2 side FC Versailles 78 progressed to the semi-final, eliminating Ligue 2 side Toulouse FC in the round of 16 via a 1–0 win, and Bergerac Périgord FC in a penalty shoot-out in the quarter-final. Versailles was eventually defeated 2–0 by Nice in the semi-finals.

== Draws and fixtures ==
On 19 April 2022, the league announced that a total of 485 teams from the region had registered for the competition, and that they would be holding the first two preliminary rounds before the end of the 2021–22 season. The first round would take place on the weekend of 22 May 2022, featuring 368 teams from the district level divisions. 93 teams from the régional level divisions would enter at the second round stage, on 12 June 2022. It was expected that a Tour de Cadrage (framing, or intermediate round) would be required at the end of August in order to have the correct number of teams in the third round.

The details of the Tour de Cadrage were published on 23 August 2022, with 14 matches featuring teams which had qualified from the second round.

The third round draw was published on 30 August 2022, with the 12 teams from Championnat National 3 entering. The fourth round draw, which saw the 6 teams from Championnat National 2 enter the competition, was published on 13 September 2022.

The fifth round draw, which saw the three teams from the region that compete in Championnat National enter the competition, was published on 29 September 2022. The sixth round draw was published on 10 October 2022.

=== First round ===
These matches were played on 22 May 2022, with two replayed on, or rescheduled for 12 June 2022. Tiers relate to the 2021–22 season.

First round results: Paris-Île-de-France
Tie no	Home team (tier)	Score	Away team (tier)
1.	OC Gif Section Foot (10)	4–5	US Jouy-en-Josas (11)
2.	FC Villepinte (10)	2–6	CS Pouchet Paris XVII (11)
3.	Saint-Thibault-des-Vignes FC (10)	1–2	ES Montreuil (10)
4.	FC Épinay Athletico (11)	5–6	AS Montigny-le-Bretonneux (10)
5.	Cosmos Saint-Denis FC (10)	3–0 (Note: Tie won by means of forfeit.)	Villebon SF (10)
6.	SS Voltaire Châtenay-Malabry (10)	3–1	CS Mennecy (10)
7.	FO Plaisirois (10)	6–2	Paris IFA (10)
8.	ASL Janville Lardy (11)	1–3	Stade de Vanves (10)
9.	FC Romainville (10)	4–0	AS Meudon (9)
10.	Sevran FC (10)	2–4	Paris SC (9)
11.	US Ris-Orangis (10)	1–1 (4–3 p)	FC Rambouillet Yvelines (10)
12.	US Ormesson-sur-Marne (10)	3–3 (5–4 p)	FC Groslay (9)
13.	FC Varennes 77 (12)	1–2	AS Sud Essonne (10)
14.	CS Dammartin (12)	3–2	OC Ivry (12)
15.	CS Cellois (13)	8–0	Mimosa Mada-Sport (12)
16.	USBS Épône (9)	2–2 (3–4 p)	FC Deuil-Enghien (10)
17.	Aigle Fertoise Boissy le Cutté (11)	2–3	AJ Limeil-Brévannes (9)
18.	FS Esbly (11)	1–4	Bann'Zanmi (11)
19.	FC Longjumeau (10)	2–2 (3–2 p) (Note: The match did not take place on the original date, because the vehicle transporting some of the players and equipment of AS Carrières Grésillons broke down en route. On receipt of the evidence, the league committee ruled that the game should be played on 12 June.)	AS Carrières Grésillons (9)
20.	ES Villiers-sur-Marne (10)	3–0	Morsang-sur-Orge FC (10)
21.	AC Gentilly (10)	3–0	ESC Paris 20 (10)
22.	SFC Champagne 95 (10)	5–1	CSM Rosny-sur-Seine (10)
23.	OSC Élancourt (10)	0–0 (2–4 p)	SC Épinay-sur-Orge (10)
24.	AS Saint-Germain-lès-Arpajon (13)	2–4	US Avonnaise (9)
25.	FC Saint-Arnoult (13)	1–1 (4–2 p)	FC Saint Vrain (11)
26.	Vers l'Avant (12)	1–2	AS Soisy-sur-Seine (10)
27.	AS Saint-Mard (11)	3–0	AS Éclair de Puiseux (12)
28.	Parmain AC (12)	4–4 (4–3 p)	SC Dugny (10)
29.	AS Louveciennes (13)	0–3	Lisses Foot 91 (13)
30.	ASS Noiséenne (10)	1–2	AS Menucourt (10)
31.	AS Fontenaisienne (13)	5–2	Neuilly-Plaisance FC (11)
32.	Stade Français (13)	2–1	FC Plateau Bréval Longnes (13)
33.	AGS Essarts-le-Roi (13)	2–4	US Villeneuve Ablon (10)
34.	SCM Châtillonnais (10)	2–2 (7–8 p)	US Chanteloup-les-Vignes (10)
35.	ASL Mesnil Saint-Denis (13)	2–10	Olympique Neuilly (9)
36.	Olympique Montigny (9)	0–2	UF Clichois (9)
37.	FC Lissois (10)	2–0	AAS Fresnes (10)
38.	Vernouillet FC (13)	1–3	Les Petits Pains (13)
39.	FC Maurecourt (13)	1–1 (5–3 p)	US Ézanville-Écouen (10)
40.	AS Versailles Jussieu (13)	0–3	Marcoussis Nozay La-Ville-du-Bois FC (10)
41.	Enfants de la Goutte d'Or (10)	4–2	CSM Île-Saint-Denis (12)
42.	USO Athis-Mons (13)	5–2	AS Fourqueux (13)
43.	AS Courdimanche (11)	0–5	US Montesson (10)
44.	Olympique Mantes (13)	3–1	Nicolaïte Chaillot Paris (9)
45.	Goellycompans FC (10)	1–2	Soisy-Andilly-Margency FC (9)
46.	CS Villetaneuse (10)	1–0	Espérance Paris 19ème (9)
47.	Champcueil FC (13)	1–3	Antony Football Evolution (13)
48.	AS Enfants de Gennevilliers (13)	3–0	Olympique Paris Espoir (11)
49.	Ablis FC Sud 78 (13)	4–2	FC Chaville (10)
50.	FA Le Raincy (10)	0–3	US Quincy-Voisins FC (9)
51.	FCO Vigneux (10)	2–0	Paris Alésia FC (10)
52.	USM Malakoff (11)	4–2	Goutte d'Or FC (12)
53.	JA Montrouge (12)	0–3	FC Wissous (9)
54.	Pierrelaye FC (12)	3–2	Flamboyants Villepinte (9)
55.	AS Benfica Yerres (13)	0–4	AS Ultra Marine Vitry (10)
56.	FC Antillais Paris 19ème (12)	3–4	AS Issou (12)
57.	RC Gonesse (10)	2–1	Saint-Cloud FC (9)
58.	JS Bondy (11)	1–3	FC Solitaires Paris Est (9)
59.	ES Villabé (11)	6–0	FC Vitry 94 Academie (12)
60.	Atletico Bagnolet (12)	3–1	AF Paris 18 (11)
61.	Olympique Viarmes Asnières-sur-Oise (11)	4–1	US Mauloise (10)
62.	Bougival Foot (12)	0–14	Draveil FC (10)
63.	FC Saint-Mande (10)	1–2	AJ Antony (11)
64.	USD Ferrières-en-Brie (11)	5–2	JS Paris (12)
65.	USM Les Clayes-sous-Bois (11)	0–0 (4–3 p)	Sèvres FC 92 (10)
66.	Juziers FC (13)	2–2 (3–4 p)	Fontenay-en-Parisis FC (11)
67.	EFC Bobigny (11)	3–0	Panamicaine FC (12)
68.	ESM Thillay-Vaudherland (11)	0–7	Voisins FC (9)
69.	Championnet Sports Paris (10)	1–11	FC Herblay-sur-Seine (9)
70.	FCM Vauréal (10)	1–2	FC Le Chesnay 78 (9)
71.	Fosses FU (11)	1–3	Sartrouville FC (9)
72.	Portugais Académica Champigny (11)	0–3	Dourdan Sport (9)
73.	AS Arnouville (11)	1–2	LSO Colombes (9)
74.	ES Saint-Pathus-Oissery (11)	1–4	Drancy FC (12)
75.	AS Vexin (11)	0–3	Gargenville Stade (9)
76.	FC Villiers-le-Bel (10)	0–1	Stade de l'Est Pavillonnais (9)
77.	Breuillet FC (10)	5–3	CA Combs-la-Ville (9)
78.	ES Montgeron (11)	1–2	CA Paris 14 (9)
79.	AS Nanteuil-lès-Meaux (10)	2–1	USA Clichy (10)
80.	FC Villennes-Orgeval (11)	1–3	Argenteuil FC (9)
81.	CS Braytois (12)	1–2	Milly Gâtinais FC (12)
82.	US Boissise-Pringy-Orgenoy (10)	2–1	FC Saint-Germain-Saintry-Saint-Pierre (11)
83.	AS Neuville-sur-Oise (12)	0–5	FC Saint-Germain-en-Laye (11)
84.	FC Villiers-sur-Orge (13)	4–0	FC Guignes (11)
85.	AS Guerville-Arnouville (12)	1–2	Magny-en-Vexin FC (12)
86.	Santeny SL (12)	3–3 (4–2 p)	Alliance 77 Évry-Grégy-Solers (12)
87.	Pays Créçois FC (9)	4–1	CSM Bonneuil-sur-Marne (9)
88.	AFL Gazeran (13)	0–3	CO Savigny (9)
89.	Garches Vaucresson FC (13)	2–8	AS Bois d'Arcy (9)
90.	FC Auvers-Ennery (10)	1–1 (3–4 p)	AS Paris (9)
91.	JS Pontoisienne (12)	2–3	EF Jean Mendez (13)
92.	ES Guyancourt Saint-Quentin-en-Yvelines (10)	1–2	FC Orsay-Bures (9)
93.	FC Bois-le-Roi (11)	1–2	Guyane FC Paris (11)
94.	GAFE Plessis-Bouchard (12)	3–4	USC Mantes (12)
95.	FC Bry (11)	4–0	Gatinais Val de Loing FC (10)
96.	AS Évry-Courcouronnes (13)	3–0	ES Saint-Germain-Laval (11)
97.	US Changis-Saint-Jean-Ussy (10)	0–3	Ménilmontant FC 1871 (11)
98.	CS Achères (13)	3–1	AS Centre de Paris (12)
99.	AFC Saint-Cyr (13)	4–0	Corbeil AC (13)
100.	USF Trilport (10)	6–1	FC Puiseux-Louvres (11)
101.	Juvisy AF Essonne (13)	3–0	FC Chevry Cossigny 77 (11)
102.	FC Coudraysien (13)	7–3	ES La Fôret (11)
103.	Lions FC Magnanville (13)	3–2	AJSC Nanterre (10)
104.	SO Rosny-sous-Bois (12)	0–3	UMS Pontault-Combault (9)
105.	AS Fontenay-Trésigny (11)	1–3	ASF Le Perreux (9)
106.	FC Écouen (9)	3–0	US Verneuil-sur-Seine (10)
107.	CSM Eaubonne (12)	1–1 (4–3 p)	Aubergenville FC (9)
108.	BO Attitude (13)	0–3	FC Andrésy (12)
109.	Saint-Michel FC 91 (11)	3–0	ES Pays de Bière (11)
110.	FC Antillais de Vigneux-sur-Seine (13)	0–3	RCP Fontainebleau (9)
111.	Marolles FC (11)	3–0	Entente Bagneaux Nemours Saint-Pierre (10)
112.	CA L'Haÿ-les-Roses (11)	3–2	Dammarie City (12)
113.	CSM Clamart Foot (10)	3–0	Villepreux FC (11)
114.	FC Vaujours (11)	0–3	Brie FC (11)
115.	US Roissy-en-France (10)	3–0	FC Émerainville (10)
116.	FC Mormant (11)	4–3	AS Ballainvilliers (10)
117.	ES Brie Nord (11)	1–4	OFC Couronnes (9)
118.	AS Lieusaint (10)	2–2 (4–3 p)	FC Brunoy (9)
119.	Bondoufle AC (11)	1–1 (8–9 p)	FC Moret-Veneux Sablons (10)
120.	CS Le Port-Marly (13)	0–4	FC Jouy-le-Moutier (10)
121.	FC Champenois-Mammesien-Vernoucellois (11)	1–3	COSM Arcueil (10)
122.	FC Fontenay-le-Fleury (12)	3–2	FC Trois Vallées (12)
123.	FC Boissy-sous-Saint-Yon (13)	0–0 (1–4 p)	Olympique Loing (10)
124.	US Carrières-sur-Seine (11)	3–3 (3–0 p)	Montreuil Souvenir 93 (11)
125.	Neuilly-Plaisance Sports (11)	3–0	AS Val de l'Yerres (12)
126.	FC Coubronnais (11)	1–3	USO Bezons (10)
127.	CS Ternes Paris-Ouest (12)	1–1 (6–7 p)	Vinsky FC (13)
128.	AC Villenoy (11)	1–1 (5–4 p)	ÉS Sourds de Vitry (12)
129.	US Paris XIème (12)	0–3	FC Brie Est (12)
130.	CF Crouy-sur-Ourcq (12)	1–3	USM Gagny (10)
131.	US Le Pecq (10)	1–1 (4–3 p)	Paris Université Club (9)
132.	US Vert-le-Grand (12)	0–4	ASC Réunionnais de Sénart (12)
133.	ES Caudacienne (12)	0–2	ASA Montereau (9)
134.	SO Vertois (13)	2–5	ES Vitry (9)
135.	AO Buc Foot (12)	1–1 (4–3 p)	Entente Pays du Limours (12)
136.	EFC Ecquevilly (12)	1–1 (3–4 p)	AS Éragny FC (10)
137.	Entente Méry-Mériel Bessancourt (10)	3–0	SC Luth (11)
138.	Héricy-Vulaines-Samoreau FC (11)	4–6	US Saclas-Méréville (12)
139.	Boissy UJ (12)	0–3	US Châtelet-en-Brie (11)
140.	Champs FC (11)	2–2 (7–6 p)	Bled FC (12)
141.	AS Beauchamp (12)	1–1 (3–1 p)	Triel AC (12)
142.	ES Plateau de Saclay (12)	2–1	US Ville d'Avray (9)
143.	Grigny FC (12)	3–2	FC Vallée 78 (9)
144.	ASC Velizy (10)	3–5	CO Cachan (9)
145.	CO Othis (10)	2–3	AS La Plaine Victoire (12)
146.	Marles AC (12)	2–3	Phare Sportive Zarzissien (12)
147.	AS Drancy Espoir (12)	4–1	FC Chauconin-Neufmontiers (12)
148.	CSA Kremlin-Bicêtre (11)	7–1	AS Grenelle (12)
149.	SFC Bailly Noisy-le-Roi (9)	3–1	JSC Pitray-Olier (10)
150.	Coulommiers Brie (12)	1–1 (4–5 p)	FC Bourget (9)
151.	Thiais FC (10)	3–0	FC La Plaine de France (11)
152.	US Montsoult-Baillet-Maffliers (12)	2–8	Pierrefitte FC (11)
153.	FC Gournay (12)	1–1 (4–3 p)	US Roissy-en-Brie (9)
154.	Magny-le-Hongre FC (11)	4–3	Trops FC (12)
155.	ES Vauxoise (12)	2–2 (1–3 p)	Entente Beaumont Mours (12)
156.	AS Fontenay-Saint-Père (12)	0–4	Amicale Villeneuve-la-Garenne (9)
157.	Bouffémont ACF (12)	0–4	SO Houilles (10)
158.	FC Bonnières-sur-Seine Freneuse (12)	0–2	Enfants de Passy Paris (11)
159.	FC Montmorency (11)	3–4	ASM Chambourcy (11)
160.	AS Mesnil-le-Roi (12)	10–0	AS Bon Conseil (12)
161.	Villeneuve AFC (12)	3–1	US Lognes (9)
162.	Association Zenaga de Figuig (12)	2–4	FC Cosmo 77 (11)
163.	FC Nogent-sur-Marne (10)	3–1	TU Verrières-le-Buisson (9)
164.	Élan Chevilly-Larue (10)	3–0 (Note: The original match, which finished 1–3, was ordered to be replayed after an error by the referee over the rules for substitutions. AS Chelles forfeited the replay.)	AS Chelles (9)
165.	AS Bucheloise (9)	2–2 (7–6 p)	JS Villetaneuse (10)
166.	Viking Club de Paris (11)	2–11	AS Outre-Mer du Bois l'Abbé (11)
167.	FC Asnières (11)	3–0	Entraide Franco Egéenne (11)
168.	US Ponthierry (10)	2–4	FC Boussy-Quincy (10)
169.	ASC Parisii (12)	1–3	FC Coignières (10)
170.	ES Paris XIII (11)	1–2	AS Champs-sur-Marne (10)
171.	ES Petit Anges Paris (11)	0–4	US Persan (9)
172.	ES Saint-Prix (10)	2–1	AS Bondy (10)
173.	FC Servon (10)	15–0	JA Paris (11)
174.	Olympique Paris 15 (11)	5–3	AJ Mézières (11)
175.	Benfica Argoselo Sports Paris (12)	0–7	ESC XVème (11)
176.	Racing Club 18ème (11)	3–3 (1–3 p)	ACS Cormeillais (9)
177.	FC Dammarie-lès-Lys (12)	0–4	RC Arpajonnais (10)
178.	Maisons-Laffitte FC (12)	3–1	Olympique Montmartre (12)
179.	AS Cheminots Ouest (12)	2–1	FC Région Houdanaise (10)
180.	Savigny-le-Temple FC (10)	4–1	FC Portugais US Ris-Orangis (11)
181.	Salésienne de Paris (9)	3–0	AS Le Pin-Villevaude (10)
182.	SC Briard (10)	0–3	La Camillienne Sports 12ème (9)
183.	Portugais Pontault-Combault (9)	2–1	UF Créteil (10)
184.	USM Bruyères-Bernes (12)	1–4	Bussy Saint-Georges FC (11)

=== Second round ===
These matches were played on 8, 9, 12, 17 and 19 June 2022, with one replayed on 28 August 2022. Tiers relate to the 2021–22 season.

Second round results: Paris-Île-de-France
Tie no	Home team (tier)	Score	Away team (tier)
1.	Sartrouville FC (9)	3–0	AS Menucourt (10)
2.	ES Montreuil (10)	2–2 (6–7 p) (Note: Tie reversed from original draw.)	Villeneuve AFC (12)
3.	FC Fontenay-le-Fleury (12)	4–3	ES Parisienne (7)
4.	ES Villabé (11)	– (Note: Match not played. Results show ES Trappes qualified.)	ES Trappes (7)
5.	FC Morangis-Chilly (7)	4–1	AS Cheminots Ouest (12)
6.	Draveil FC (10)	2–1	SFC Bailly Noisy-le-Roi (9)
7.	CA L'Haÿ-les-Roses (11)	0–6	US Ris-Orangis (10)
8.	AS Ultra Marine Vitry (10)	0–3 (Note: Tie won by means of forfeit.)	Neuilly-Plaisance Sports (11)
9.	Olympique Viarmes Asnières-sur-Oise (11)	3–0	Champs FC (11)
10.	USM Gagny (10)	3–0	AS Saint-Mard (11)
11.	US Le Pecq (10)	1–5	ASA Issy (7)
12.	AJ Antony (11)	5–1	AS Lieusaint (10)
13.	US Châtelet-en-Brie (11)	2–2 (5–4 p)	FC Wissous (9)
14.	CS Dammartin (12)	0–5	Espérance Aulnay (6)
15.	FC Deuil-Enghien (10)	1–1 (4–5 p)	Mitry-Mory (7)
16.	US Chanteloup-les-Vignes (10)	2–2 (4–3 p)	Cergy Pontoise FC (6)
17.	AC Villenoy (11)	1–4	CO Vincennes (6)
18.	CO Cachan (9)	1–1 (6–5 p)	Val d'Europe FC (7)
19.	FC Cosmo 77 (11)	5–0	Atletico Bagnolet (12)
20.	AS Sud Essonne (10)	2–4	FC Rueil Malmaison (8)
21.	RC Gonesse (10)	– (Note: Result unknown.)	COSM Arcueil (10)
22.	ES Seizième (8)	6–0	Noisy-le-Grand FC (6)
23.	CSM Clamart Foot (10)	0–0 (2–4 p)	Champigny FC 94 (7)
24.	ES Vitry (9)	0–3	Cosmo Taverny (7)
25.	Savigny-le-Temple FC (10)	1–1 (6–5 p)	Saint-Michel FC 91 (11)
26.	Argenteuil FC (9)	2–2 (4–3 p)	UF Clichois (9)
27.	Pierrefitte FC (11)	1–2	Pierrelaye FC (12)
28.	SS Voltaire Châtenay-Malabry (10)	2–0	Paray FC (8)
29.	ASA Montereau (9)	2–2 (Note: Match abandoned during the penalty shoot-out, after racist abuse from the home fans towards the US Palaiseau goalkeeper led to the team leaving the field. The league penalised ASA Montereau with a two-year ban from the competition. US Palaiseau qualify.)	US Palaiseau (8)
30.	AS Éragny FC (10)	1–4 (Note: The original tie ended 1–4, but the league demanded the game should be replayed. No result found for the replayed match, but Épinay Académie qualified for the next round.)	Épinay Académie (8)
31.	AS Montigny-le-Bretonneux (10)	2–2 (5–6 p)	COM Bagneux (8)
32.	US Jouy-en-Josas (11)	7–2	FC Asnières (11)
33.	ES Stains (8)	1–1 (5–4 p)	FC Ozoir-la-Ferrière 77 (7)
34.	FC Moret-Veneux Sablons (10)	2–7	FC Lissois (10)
35.	RC Arpajonnais (10)	6–1	Olympique Paris 15 (11)
36.	Lions FC Magnanville (13)	2–5	AF Garenne-Colombes (6)
37.	ASC La Courneuve (8)	10–1	USD Ferrières-en-Brie (11)
38.	US Hardricourt (8)	2–1	ES Colombienne (6)
39.	ES Villiers-sur-Marne (10)	1–10	US Sénart-Moissy (6)
40.	Enfants de Passy Paris (11)	2–4	FC Montfermeil (7)
41.	CA Paris 14 (9)	1–3	FC Igny (7)
42.	Pays Créçois FC (9)	0–2	AAS Sarcelles (7)
43.	US Roissy-en-France (10)	0–3	USM Villeparisis (8)
44.	Antony Football Evolution (13)	4–0 (Note: Antony Football Evolution penalised for fielding suspended players. FC Étampes qualify.)	FC Étampes (8)
45.	Entente Méry-Mériel Bessancourt (10)	1–0	CSM Gennevilliers (7)
46.	AS Beauchamp (12)	3–3 (2–4 p)	AS Bucheloise (9)
47.	Lisses Foot 91 (13)	3–1	CA Paris-Charenton (8)
48.	FC Melun (7)	3–0	AS Soisy-sur-Seine (10)
49.	UMS Pontault-Combault (9)	2–4	CS Villetaneuse (10)
50.	AS Champs-sur-Marne (10)	1–3	Saint-Brice FC (6)
51.	Parmain AC (12)	0–5	Vinsky FC (13)
52.	US Avonnaise (9)	2–3	US Grigny (7)
53.	Olympique Neuilly (9)	3–0	La Camillienne Sports 12ème (9)
54.	US Saclas-Méréville (12)	1–3	US Rungis (7)
55.	Bussy Saint-Georges FC (11)	2–1	FC Nogent-sur-Marne (10)
56.	FC Servon (10)	2–1	Bann'Zanmi (11)
57.	FC Saint-Germain-en-Laye (11)	3–0	Entente Beaumont Mours (12)
58.	ASC Réunionnais de Sénart (12)	3–1	AS Fontenaisienne (13)
59.	AS Mesnil-le-Roi (12)	2–6	USM Malakoff (11)
60.	AS Outre-Mer du Bois l'Abbé (11)	2–1	AS Nanteuil-lès-Meaux (10)
61.	Marolles FC (11)	6–2	FC Mormant (11)
62.	Dourdan Sport (9)	3–2	US Villeneuve Ablon (10)
63.	Fontenay-en-Parisis FC (11)	0–2	EFC Bobigny (11)
64.	Brie FC (11)	4–1	FC Gournay (12)
65.	AS Issou (12)	1–8	Osny FC (8)
66.	Stade Français (13)	0–2	Neauphle-le-Château-Pontchartrain RC 78 (7)
67.	Juvisy AF Essonne (13)	2–2 (4–3 p)	RCP Fontainebleau (9)
68.	CS Cellois (13)	0–0 (4–5 p)	ES Viry-Châtillon (6)
69.	FC Villiers-sur-Orge (13)	4–0	AFC Saint-Cyr (13)
70.	AS Chatou (6)	15–0	Magny-en-Vexin FC (12)
71.	ES Plateau de Saclay (12)	0–4	JS Suresnes (7)
72.	Gargenville Stade (9)	1–0	Olympique Adamois (7)
73.	AS Paris (9)	1–6	CSM Puteaux (8)
74.	SO Houilles (10)	1–2	CSL Aulnay (8)
75.	AS La Plaine Victoire (12)	3–7	SFC Champagne 95 (10)
76.	Magny-le-Hongre FC (11)	3–1	Guyane FC Paris (11)
77.	Les Petits Pains (13)	1–2	USC Mantes (12)
78.	Drancy FC (12)	1–1 (7–8 p)	FC Saint-Leu (6)
79.	USM Les Clayes-sous-Bois (11)	1–4	FC Plessis-Robinson (6)
80.	Grigny FC (12)	1–0	AO Buc Foot (12)
81.	Maisons-Laffitte FC (12)	6–3	AS Drancy Espoir (12)
82.	Santeny SL (12)	1–5	Évry FC (8)
83.	OFC Couronnes (9)	2–6	US Montesson (10)
84.	Stade de l'Est Pavillonnais (9)	0–1	US Torcy (6)
85.	Milly Gâtinais FC (12)	1–1 (4–2 p)	Sucy FC (6)
86.	FC Coignières (10)	0–3	AC Paris 15 (7)
87.	OFC Pantin (8)	3–2	Meaux ADOM (7)
88.	EF Jean Mendez (13)	7–2	US Carrières-sur-Seine (11)
89.	Ménilmontant FC 1871 (11)	0–5	Enfants de la Goutte d'Or (10)
90.	Élan Chevilly-Larue (10)	3–0	Saint-Denis US (6)
91.	US Ormesson-sur-Marne (10)	4–1	US Boissise-Pringy-Orgenoy (10)
92.	CO Savigny (9)	2–2 (4–5 p)	US Fontenay-sous-Bois (7)
93.	SC Gretz-Tournan (8)	– (Note: Match did not take place due to the sporting facilities at Stade Lucien Laumonde being closed without announcement. The league committee penalised SC Gretz-Tournan. CA Vitry qualify.)	CA Vitry (6)
94.	Saint-Maur VGA (8)	3–0	Portugais Pontault-Combault (9)
95.	FC Coudraysien (13)	1–3	FC Maisons Alfort (8)
96.	FC Maurecourt (13)	1–5	RFC Argenteuil (8)
97.	FCM Garges-lès-Gonesse (8)	0–3	Claye-Souilly SF (6)
98.	AC Gentilly (10)	2–5	FC Courcouronnes (7)
99.	Olympique Loing (10)	1–4	Tremplin Foot (8)
100.	AS Enfants de Gennevilliers (13)	2–8	FO Plaisirois (10)
101.	FC Écouen (9)	2–6	Montrouge FC 92 (6)
102.	USO Athis-Mons (13)	2–2 (4–2 p)	FC Boussy-Quincy (10)
103.	CSM Eaubonne (12)	2–1	Olympique Mantes (13)
104.	ESC XVème (11)	2–5	ASF Le Perreux (9)
105.	FCO Vigneux (10)	0–2	UJA Maccabi Paris Métropole (8)
106.	FC Jouy-le-Moutier (10)	1–2	Courbevoie Sports (7)
107.	CSA Kremlin-Bicêtre (11)	1–2 (Note: Match was replayed on 28 August after an appeal lodged by CSA Kremlin-Bicêtre regarding the original match.)	FC Romainville (10)
108.	Paris SC (9)	3–1	Val de France Foot (8)
109.	USO Bezons (10)	2–2 (4–5 p)	ALJ Limay (8)
110.	SC Épinay-sur-Orge (10)	5–1	FC Bry (11)
111.	CS Achères (13)	1–2	ES Saint-Prix (10)
112.	AJ Limeil-Brévannes (9)	1–2	Val Yerres Crosne AF (7)
113.	Amicale Villeneuve-la-Garenne (9)	5–1	ES Marly-la-Ville (8)
114.	Cosmos Saint-Denis FC (10)	1–5	Salésienne de Paris (9)
115.	FC Brie Est (12)	0–6	FC Livry-Gargan (7)
116.	AS Évry-Courcouronnes (13)	0–2	US Villejuif (7)
117.	Stade de Vanves (10)	2–4	Thiais FC (10)
118.	FC Andrésy (12)	1–4	ES Nanterre (7)
119.	AS Ermont (8)	0–1	Conflans FC (6)
120.	USF Trilport (10)	1–1 (4–5 p)	AS Choisy-le-Roi (7)
121.	AS Bois d'Arcy (9)	1–1 (3–4 p)	Montreuil FC (7)
122.	FC Herblay-sur-Seine (9)	0–7	FC Les Lilas (6)
123.	ASM Chambourcy (11)	5–1	Phare Sportive Zarzissien (12)
124.	US Persan (9)	2–2 (5–4 p)	US Vaires-sur-Marne (8)
125.	Ablis FC Sud 78 (13)	0–7	Marcoussis Nozay La-Ville-du-Bois FC (10)
126.	US Quincy-Voisins FC (9)	0–1	FC Goussainville (8)
127.	ES Cesson Vert Saint-Denis (7)	2–0	Athletic Club de Boulogne-Billancourt (6)
128.	CS Pouchet Paris XVII (11)	2–4	FC Franconville (7)
129.	Voisins FC (9)	5–0	FC Massy 91 (8)
130.	FC Bourget (9)	1–0	LSO Colombes (9)
131.	Soisy-Andilly-Margency FC (9)	0–5	Olympique Noisy-le-Sec (6)
132.	US Marly-le-Roi (8)	0–1	FC Issy-les-Moulineaux (7)
133.	FC Solitaires Paris Est (9)	1–8	SFC Neuilly-sur-Marne (7)
134.	ACS Cormeillais (9)	0–3	AC Houilles (7)
135.	FC Saint-Arnoult (13)	3–2	FC Orsay-Bures (9)
136.	Breuillet FC (10)	0–5	Le Mée Sports (6)
137.	FC Le Chesnay 78 (9)	1–3	AS Saint-Ouen-l'Aumône (6)
138.	AS Maurepas (8)	2–3	Villemomble Sports (6)

=== Intermediate round ===
These matches were played on 28 August and 4 September 2022

Intermediate round results: Paris-Île-de-France
Tie no	Home team (tier)	Score	Away team (tier)
1.	ES Saint-Prix (10)	1–4	ES Stains (8)
2.	Juvisy AF Essonne (12)	3–7	Thiais FC (9)
3.	US Persan (9)	1–5	Mitry-Mory (7)
4.	Neuilly-Plaisance Sports (11)	0–6	Saint-Maur VGA (7)
5.	FC Longjumeau (10)	2–3	FC Melun (7)
6.	SS Voltaire Châtenay-Malabry (10)	1–3	FC Maisons Alfort (8)
7.	USM Gagny (10)	– (Note: The referee did not allow the match to take place, because USM Gagny could not produce a team sheet. The league committee penalised USM Gagny. Salésienne de Paris qualify for the next round.)	Salésienne de Paris (8)
8.	FC Saint-Germain-en-Laye (11)	0–11	AC Paris 15 (7)
9.	Lisses Foot 91 (13)	0–3 (Note: Tie won by means of forfeit.)	US Châtelet-en-Brie (11)
10.	Pierrelaye FC (11)	0–1	CSM Puteaux (7)
11.	Marolles FC (10)	0–3	Marcoussis Nozay La-Ville-du-Bois FC (9)
12.	ASC Réunionnais de Sénart (12)	4–2	RC Arpajonnais (11)
13.	Bussy Saint-Georges FC (9)	1–2	EFC Bobigny (10)
14.	Draveil FC (10)	0–4	ES Seizième (9)

=== Third round ===
These matches were played on 10, 11 and 18 September 2022

Third round results: Paris-Île-de-France
Tie no	Home team (tier)	Score	Away team (tier)
1.	ASA Issy (7)	0–0 (2–3 p)	Blanc-Mesnil SF (5)
2.	Savigny-le-Temple FC (10)	1–3	AS Choisy-le-Roi (7)
3.	Neauphle-le-Château-Pontchartrain RC 78 (7)	2–2 (2–4 p)	RFC Argenteuil (7)
4.	US Chanteloup-les-Vignes (10)	2–2 (0–3 p)	Amicale Villeneuve-la-Garenne (8)
5.	AJ Antony (11)	1–2	Saint-Maur VGA (7)
6.	USO Athis-Mons (13)	3–1	FC Saint-Arnoult (13)
7.	ASM Chambourcy (10)	0–6	AS Saint-Ouen-l'Aumône (6)
8.	RC Gonesse (10)	2–0	Olympique Noisy-le-Sec (7)
9.	Entente Méry-Mériel Bessancourt (10)	0–0 (3–5 p)	US Hardricourt (8)
10.	Thiais FC (9)	2–0	Val Yerres Crosne AF (7)
11.	Dourdan Sport (10)	2–2 (6–5 p)	CO Cachan (10)
12.	Brie FC (11)	0–5	FC Montfermeil (8)
13.	ALJ Limay (9)	1–2	FC Saint-Leu (6)
14.	FC Courcouronnes (8)	0–2	US Sénart-Moissy (6)
15.	AS Outre-Mer du Bois l'Abbé (10)	0–1	FC Les Lilas (6)
16.	FC Cosmo 77 (11)	0–6	US Villejuif (6)
17.	Cosmo Taverny (7)	3–1	Sartrouville FC (8)
18.	Enfants de la Goutte d'Or (9)	0–5	Villemomble Sports (7)
19.	US Montesson (10)	2–5	JS Suresnes (7)
20.	FC Romainville (11)	0–2	EF Jean Mendez (12)
21.	Tremplin Foot (9)	5–5 (4–2 p)	FC Servon (10)
22.	FC Livry-Gargan (7)	0–3	Champigny FC 94 (7)
23.	Maisons-Laffitte FC (12)	0–6	FC Issy-les-Moulineaux (8)
24.	ES Stains (8)	0–2	AC Paris 15 (7)
25.	US Châtelet-en-Brie (11)	0–5	Évry FC (9)
26.	Argenteuil FC (8)	5–1	ASF Le Perreux (8)
27.	FO Plaisirois (10)	1–7	Entente SSG (5)
28.	Olympique Viarmes Asnières-sur-Oise (10)	0–6	Espérance Aulnay (6)
29.	US Fontenay-sous-Bois (7)	1–1 (3–4 p)	SFC Neuilly-sur-Marne (6)
30.	Épinay Académie (8)	0–3	US Ivry (5)
31.	Paris SC (9)	0–2	AAS Sarcelles (7)
32.	Villeneuve AFC (11)	1–1 (2–4 p)	EFC Bobigny (10)
33.	US Jouy-en-Josas (10)	2–7	US Grigny (7)
34.	CS Villetaneuse (10)	3–0	AS Bucheloise (10)
35.	Milly Gâtinais FC (11)	0–3	FC Plessis-Robinson (6)
36.	US Ormesson-sur-Marne (10)	0–3	CS Brétigny (5)
37.	Mitry-Mory (7)	1–1 (3–4 p)	CA Vitry (5)
38.	Élan Chevilly-Larue (9)	1–1 (5–6 p)	CS Meaux (6)
39.	SC Épinay-sur-Orge (11)	1–12	Le Mée Sports (5)
40.	Magny-le-Hongre FC (10)	0–6	JA Drancy (5)
41.	FC Lissois (10)	0–3	CO Vincennes (6)
42.	FC Maisons Alfort (8)	1–4	ESA Linas-Montlhéry (5)
43.	US Ris-Orangis (10)	1–1 (4–3 p)	ES Trappes (7)
44.	USC Mantes (12)	0–5	AF Garenne-Colombes (7)
45.	Courbevoie Sports (8)	3–1	AS Chatou (6)
46.	FC Melun (7)	11–0 (Note: Tie reversed from original draw.)	FC Villiers-sur-Orge (12)
47.	Olympique Neuilly (9)	1–2	FC Mantois 78 (6)
48.	FC Fontenay-le-Fleury (11)	1–5	FC Morangis-Chilly (7)
49.	USM Villeparisis (8)	0–4	AC Houilles (7)
50.	OFC Pantin (8)	1–2	Saint-Brice FC (6)
51.	CSM Eaubonne (11)	1–3	Claye-Souilly SF (6)
52.	Osny FC (9)	0–6	FCM Aubervilliers (5)
53.	SFC Champagne 95 (9)	0–0 (9–10 p)	CSM Puteaux (7)
54.	Conflans FC (7)	1–2	CO Les Ulis (5)
55.	FC Igny (7)	0–1	OFC Les Mureaux (5)
56.	Voisins FC (9)	1–4	Montrouge FC 92 (5)
57.	FC Goussainville (8)	6–4	Montreuil FC (7)
58.	FC Étampes (9)	1–1 (2–4 p)	Vinsky FC (12)
59.	ES Nanterre (6)	2–0	US Palaiseau (7)
60.	ASC La Courneuve (8)	1–2	US Torcy (6)
61.	Marcoussis Nozay La-Ville-du-Bois FC (9)	4–1	USM Malakoff (11)
62.	COM Bagneux (8)	1–4	ES Cesson Vert Saint-Denis (7)
63.	Salésienne de Paris (8)	1–2	FC Bourget (9)
64.	CSL Aulnay (8)	1–3	UJA Maccabi Paris Métropole (8)
65.	ASC Réunionnais de Sénart (12)	2–1 (Note: ASC Réunionnais de Sénart penalised for fielding an ineligible player, ES Viry-Châtillon qualify.)	ES Viry-Châtillon (6)
66.	ES Seizième (9)	0–0 (6–7 p)	FC Rueil Malmaison (7)
67.	Gargenville Stade (10)	0–4	FC Franconville (7)
68.	Grigny FC (11)	1–6 (Note: The original match scheduled for 11 September 2022 was not played, due to the referee refusing to accept a paper team-sheet. The league ordered the match to be rescheduled for 18 September 2022, due to referee error.)	US Rungis (8)

=== Fourth round ===
These matches were played on 24 and 25 September 2022

Fourth round results: Paris-Île-de-France
Tie no	Home team (tier)	Score	Away team (tier)
1.	US Sénart-Moissy (6)	0–1	AS Poissy (4)
2.	ESA Linas-Montlhéry (5)	1–1 (4–2 p)	Entente SSG (5)
3.	AC Houilles (7)	1–2	FC Fleury 91 (4)
4.	FC Mantois 78 (6)	0–0 (4–2 p)	AS Saint-Ouen-l'Aumône (6)
5.	ES Nanterre (6)	0–1	Sainte-Geneviève Sports (4)
6.	AF Garenne-Colombes (7)	1–6	US Lusitanos Saint-Maur (4)
7.	RFC Argenteuil (7)	2–0	Blanc-Mesnil SF (5)
8.	SFC Neuilly-sur-Marne (6)	3–3 (5–3 p)	FC Morangis-Chilly (7)
9.	Cosmo Taverny (7)	0–2	CS Brétigny (5)
10.	CS Villetaneuse (10)	0–4	US Créteil-Lusitanos (4)
11.	US Grigny (7)	4–0	FC Franconville (7)
12.	Thiais FC (9)	1–2	Espérance Aulnay (6)
13.	US Villejuif (6)	3–1	FC Melun (7)
14.	FC Montfermeil (8)	4–5	Marcoussis Nozay La-Ville-du-Bois FC (9)
15.	RC Gonesse (10)	3–1	FC Plessis-Robinson (6)
16.	Claye-Souilly SF (6)	8–0	CSM Puteaux (7)
17.	EF Jean Mendez (12)	3–7	US Torcy (6)
18.	JS Suresnes (7)	3–1	FC Goussainville (8)
19.	US Ris-Orangis (10)	1–4	FCM Aubervilliers (5)
20.	UJA Maccabi Paris Métropole (8)	2–3	AC Paris 15 (7)
21.	FC Les Lilas (6)	1–1 (3–5 p)	Racing Club de France Football (4)
22.	AAS Sarcelles (7)	6–1	Courbevoie Sports (8)
23.	Argenteuil FC (8)	1–7	CO Les Ulis (5)
24.	Villemomble Sports (7)	1–2	Montrouge FC 92 (5)
25.	FC Bourget (9)	1–3	Saint-Maur VGA (7)
26.	Champigny FC 94 (7)	1–1 (3–5 p)	US Ivry (5)
27.	Évry FC (9)	1–4	CA Vitry (5)
28.	OFC Les Mureaux (5)	2–1	Saint-Brice FC (6)
29.	US Rungis (8)	1–3	JA Drancy (5)
30.	USO Athis-Mons (13)	0–0 (3–5 p)	Dourdan Sport (10)
31.	FC Rueil Malmaison (7)	3–2	CO Vincennes (6)
32.	ES Cesson Vert Saint-Denis (7)	1–3	Le Mée Sports (5)
33.	FC Issy-les-Moulineaux (8)	2–1	ES Viry-Châtillon (6)
34.	Vinsky FC (12)	1–1 (3–4 p)	Tremplin Foot (9)
35.	AS Choisy-le-Roi (7)	1–2	CS Meaux (6)
36.	Amicale Villeneuve-la-Garenne (8)	1–1 (2–4 p)	US Hardricourt (8)
37.	EFC Bobigny (10)	0–1	FC Saint-Leu (6)

=== Fifth round ===
These matches were played on 8 and 9 October 2022

Fifth round results: Paris-Île-de-France
Tie no	Home team (tier)	Score	Away team (tier)
1.	Dourdan Sport (10)	0–5	ESA Linas-Montlhéry (5)
2.	Montrouge FC 92 (5)	3–4	US Villejuif (6)
3.	Sainte-Geneviève Sports (4)	3–1	OFC Les Mureaux (5)
4.	Tremplin Foot (9)	1–5	AC Paris 15 (7)
5.	SFC Neuilly-sur-Marne (6)	0–1	AS Poissy (4)
6.	RFC Argenteuil (7)	1–3 (Note: Match abandoned by the referee after 85 minutes due to pitch invasions and flares being thrown by home fans. RFC Argenteuil penalise, FC Versailles qualify.)	FC Versailles (3)
7.	US Lusitanos Saint-Maur (4)	1–1 (6–7 p)	FCM Aubervilliers (5)
8.	FC Saint-Leu (6)	0–3	Red Star F.C. (3)
9.	Saint-Maur VGA (7)	3–1	Le Mée Sports (5)
10.	US Hardricourt (8)	2–7	AAS Sarcelles (7)
11.	Espérance Aulnay (6)	1–4	JA Drancy (5)
12.	Racing Club de France Football (4)	2–2 (1–4 p)	US Créteil-Lusitanos (4)
13.	FC Mantois 78 (6)	0–2	Paris 13 Atletico (3)
14.	Marcoussis Nozay La-Ville-du-Bois FC (9)	4–2	FC Issy-les-Moulineaux (8)
15.	RC Gonesse (10)	1–1 (0–2 p)	JS Suresnes (7)
16.	FC Rueil Malmaison (7)	0–4	FC Fleury 91 (4)
17.	CS Brétigny (5)	0–1	US Ivry (5)
18.	CS Meaux (6)	0–1	CO Les Ulis (5)
19.	CA Vitry (5)	1–2	Claye-Souilly SF (6)
20.	US Torcy (6)	1–2	US Grigny (7)

=== Sixth round ===
These matches were played on 15 and 16 October 2022

Sixth round results: Paris-Île-de-France
Tie no	Home team (tier)	Score	Away team (tier)
1.	FC Versailles (3)	1–1 (4–5 p)	Red Star F.C. (3)
2.	US Villejuif (6)	1–2	JA Drancy (5)
3.	AC Paris 15 (7)	2–1	US Créteil-Lusitanos (4)
4.	Marcoussis Nozay La-Ville-du-Bois FC (9)	3–3 (4–3 p) (Note: A challenge was lodged after the game, claiming a technical error by the referee, who blew the whistle after the home team goalkeeper saved a penalty, but before the ball came to rest. The challenge was rejected due to being incorrectly lodged, and the result stood.)	JS Suresnes (7)
5.	CO Les Ulis (5)	3–0	Claye-Souilly SF (6)
6.	AAS Sarcelles (7)	1–1 (4–5 p)	ESA Linas-Montlhéry (5)
7.	Saint-Maur VGA (7)	0–2	Paris 13 Atletico (3)
8.	US Ivry (5)	1–3	FC Fleury 91 (4)
9.	US Grigny (7)	1–2	FCM Aubervilliers (5)
10.	AS Poissy (4)	1–0	Sainte-Geneviève Sports (4)
