= ASCR =

ASCR may refer to:

- Academy of Sciences of the Czech Republic (renamed as Czech Academy of Sciences, however)
- Adult stem cell research
- AS Choisy-le-Roi, a French football club
- ASUS Smart Contrast Ratio, a vendor-specific rating for dynamic contrast ratio
- Advanced Scientific Computing Research, a program office at Office of Science
