= Yannis Takerboucht =

French footballer (born 1993)

Personal information
- Date of birth: 3 February 1993 (age 33)
- Place of birth: France
- Position: Defender

Senior career*
Years	Team	Apps	(Gls)
-2013	Paris Saint-Germain F.C.	0	(0)
2013/2014	Racing de Santander	0	(0)
2014-2015	AS Poissy	11	(1)
2015/2016	RC Arbaâ	6	(0)
-2017	FCM Aubervilliers	13+	(1+)
2017	FC Martigues	0	(0)
2017-2018	FCM Aubervilliers	5	(0)
2018/2019	Houilles AC		
2019/2020	FCM Aubervilliers		
- * Club domestic league appearances and goals

Yannis Takerboucht (born 3 February 1993 in France) is a French footballer.
