= David Lollia =

French footballer (born 1969)

Personal information
- Full name: David Lollia
- Date of birth: December 20, 1969 (age 56)
- Place of birth: Paris, France
- Height: 1.78 m (5 ft 10 in)
- Position: Midfielder

Senior career*
Years	Team	Apps	(Gls)
1987–1989	RCF Paris	0	(0)
1989–1990	Valenciennes	0	(0)
1990–1995	Chamois Niortais	113	(3)
1995–1996	Tours	?	(?)
1996–1999	Créteil	26	(5)
1999–2000	Paris FC	17	(0)
2000–2001	Naval	?	(?)
2001–2002	Noisy-le-Sec	21	(2)
2002–2003	Poissy	2	(0)
2003–2004	Choisy-le-Roi	5	(0)
- * Club domestic league appearances and goals

David Lollia (born December 20, 1969) is a former professional footballer who played as a midfielder.
