= Gilles Bocq =

French footballer (born 1950)

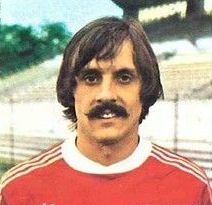
- Bocq with Rouen in the 1977–78 season

Personal information
- Date of birth: 23 January 1950 (age 75)
- Place of birth: Paris, France
- Position(s): Defender

Senior career*
Years	Team	Apps	(Gls)
1973–1977	Malakoff		
1977–1979	Rouen	17	(0)
- *Club domestic league appearances and goals

Gilles Bocq (born 23 January 1950) is a French former professional footballer who played as a defender. He made twelve Division 1 appearances for Rouen in the 1977–78 season.
