= Andreas Manga =

French footballer (born 1980)

Yves Andréas Manga
Personal information
- Full name: Yves Andréas Manga
- Date of birth: October 15, 1980 (age 46)
- Place of birth: Pikine, Senegal
- Height: 1.90 m (6 ft 3 in)
- Position: Defender

Youth career
- –1999: AC Le Havre

Senior career*
Years	Team	Apps	(Gls)
1999–2001	AC Le Havre	2	(0)
2003–2004	AS Choisy-le-Roi		
2004–2005	US Changé		
2005–2006	SC Feignies		
2006–2007	Royale Union Saint Gilloise	21	(0)
2007–2008	KSK Beveren	17	(0)
2009–2010	PAEEK		
2010–2011	Croix Daurade		
2011–2012	Perpignan Canet FC		
- * Club domestic league appearances and goals

Yves Andréas Manga (born 15 October 1980) is a French football defender of Senegalese origin. He is currently without a club after being released by Perpignan Canet FC.

The reason for this release was the reckless behaviour on the pitch during the 2007-08 season. After 24 matchdays, Manga had received red cards against Tubize, VW Hamme and OH Leuven. On matchday 25, against Antwerp, Manga made a dangerous two-footed challenge on Luciano Olguín. He only received a yellow card, but was substituted during the break after some other risky interventions.

== Personal life ==
Manga acquired French nationality by naturalization on 1 June 2004.
