= FC Les Lilas =

French football club

- Full name: Football Club Les Lilas
- Founded: 1947
- Ground: Parc Municipal des Sports, Les Lilas
- Capacity: 1,500
- League: Championnat de France Amateurs 2
- 2008–09: Championnat de France Amateurs 2, 6th
Home colours	Away colours

Football Club Les Lilas is a French football club based in Les Lilas, Seine-Saint-Denis. It was founded in 1947. The club currently plays in the Championnat de France Amateurs 2, the fifth tier of the French football league system.

== Honours ==
- Champions DH Paris: 1995

== Notable players ==
- (France) Jean-Clair Todibo (youth)
