= USM Malakoff (football) =

Football team in Malakoff, France

Malakoff
- Full name: Union Sportive Municipal de Malakoff
- Nicknames: Les Bleu et Rouge (The Blue and Reds)
- Founded: 1945
- Stadium: Stade Marcel Cerdan; Stade Lénine
- Capacity: 1,448
- Head coach: (France) Romain
- League: Départemental 3 Paris Île-de-France, Hauts-de-Seine
- Website: https://www.usmmalakoff.fr/section-football

Union Sportive Municipale de Malakoff is a football team located in Malakoff, France. It is the football section of the parent multi-sport club USM Malakoff. As of the 2020–21 season, the team plays in the Départemental 3, the eleventh tier of French football. The club's colours are blue and red.

== History ==
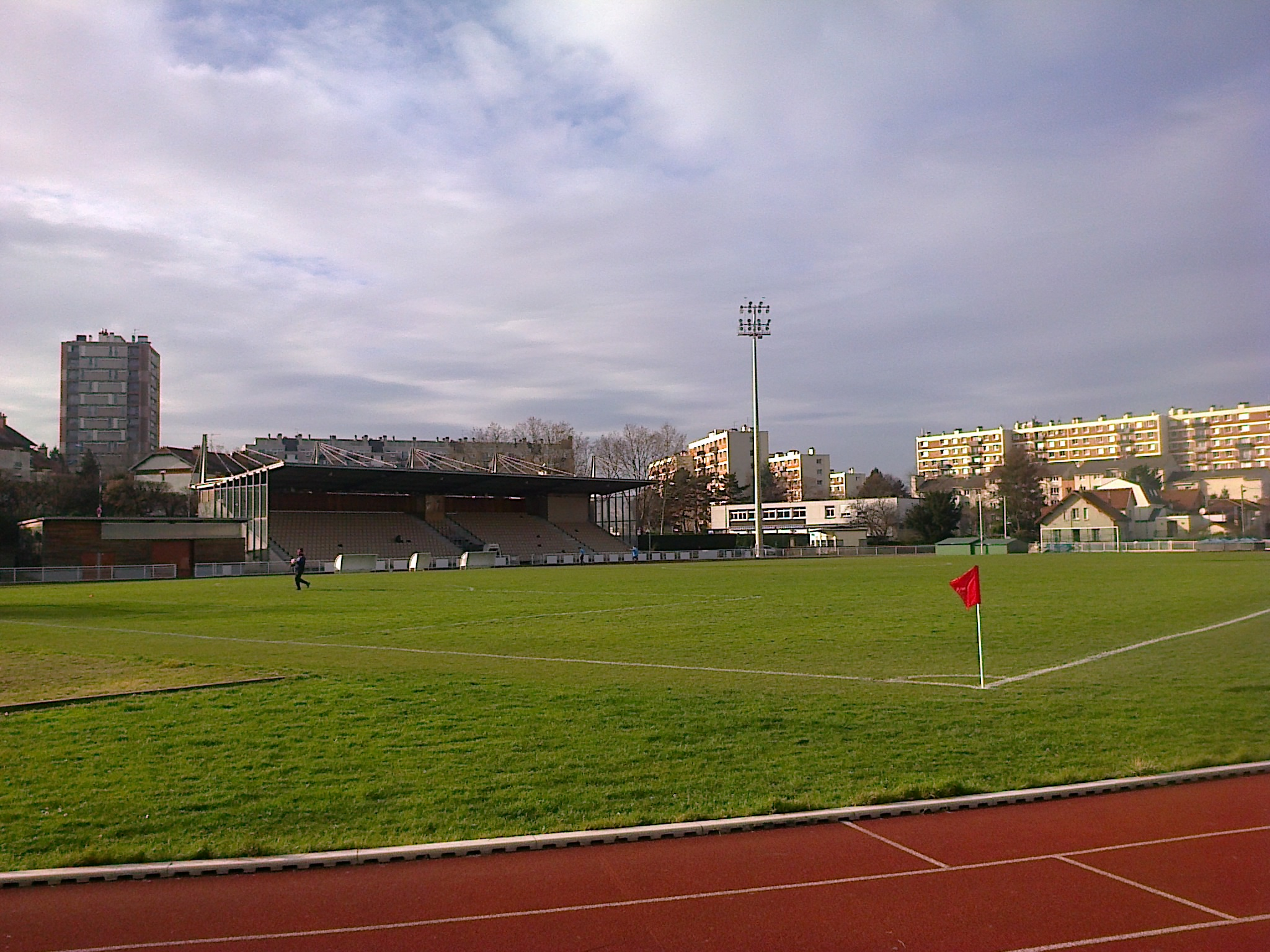
The Stade Marcel Cerdan

USM Malakoff was founded in 1945. The highest tier the club has reached in the French football league system is the Division 2, playing in the division in the 1975–76 season. However, they finished 18th in their group and were relegated. In total, USM Malakoff played 25 seasons of football at national level from 1966 to 1991. In the Coupe de France, the club has reached round of 32 on six occasions.

In November 1953, Malakoff played in a friendly match against the Hungary national team, who were Olympic gold medalists at the time. The event attracted a significant crowd of 10,000 people at the Stade Marcel Cerdan.

=== Managerial history ===
- 1949–1979: (France) Yves Cros
- 1979–1985: (France) Yves Fercoq
- 2019–????: Nouar Hassani

== Honours ==
USM Malakoff
Honours	No.	Years
Division d'Honneur Paris	2	1965–66, 1979–80 (Note: The 1979–80 Division d'Honneur Paris was won by the B team of USM Malakoff.)
Division 3 runner-up	1	1974–75

== Notable former players ==
- (Gabon) Pierre Aubameyang
- (France) Robert Blanc
- (France) Gilles Bocq
- (France) Marc Collat
- (France) Patrick Grappin
- (France) Maxen Kapo
- (Republic of the Congo) Paul Moukila
- (Cameroon) Eric Yapi Cielenou
