= Évry FC =

Football french club

- Full name: L'Évry Football Club
- Founded: 2012
- Ground: Stade Jean-Louis Moulin; Évry, Essonne, Paris
- Manager: Mohamed Lemba
- League: R3 Paris Île-de-France
- 2018–19: R3 Paris Île-de-France Group A, 10th
- Website: www.evryfootballclub.com

Évry FC is a French association football club founded in 2012 by the merger of L'Association Sportive Évry Football (founded in 1898) and Ville d'Évry Sport Club. They are based in Évry, France and currently play at level 8 (Regional 3, Paris Île-de-France) of the French football league system. They play at the Stade Jean-Louis Moulin in Évry.

== Notable coaches ==
- Bernard Touret (1996–2011)
