= CO Les Ulis =

French football club

- Full name: Club Omnisports des Ulis
- Founded: 1977
- Ground: Stade Jean-Marc Salinier; Les Ulis
- Capacity: 2,000
- Chairman: Marc Le Prunnenec
- Manager: Aziz Benaaddane
- League: Régional 1 Paris-Île-de-France
- 2022–23: National 3 Group L, 10th (relegated)
- Website: http://www.uliscofootball.fr
Home colours	Away colours

Le Club Omnisports des Ulis is a French association football club based in Les Ulis, Essonne, founded in 1977. As of the 2023–24 season, they play in Régional 1, the sixth tier of the French football league system, following relegation at the end of the 2022–23 Championnat National 3 season. They play at the Stade Salinier, named after Jean-Marc Salinier, a local politician from the area, in Les Ulis. CO Les Ulis is primarily known for being the club where France national team members Patrice Evra and Thierry Henry began their careers. The club has also developed emerging youth prospects, such as Anthony Martial, Yaya Sanogo, Sega Keita, and Willy Kambwala.

== History ==
CO Les Ulis was formed relatively late, primarily due to the commune of Les Ulis also coming into existence late. Both the city and the club formed in 1977 with the commune coming into existence in February and the club being formed in May. After only 8 years of existence, the club had already developed eight sections of sport, which had over 1,000 members associated with football being the most popular in the club. By 2005, these numbers rose to over 36 sections of sport with 3,600 members.

CO Les Ulis honours are minimal with the club slowly ascending the French football league system since achieving promotion from the Division d'Excellence during the 1994–95 season. The club is currently playing in the Division Honneur of the Île-de-France region after achieving promotion from the Division Supérieure Régionale during the 2009–10 season.

== Players ==
=== Current squad ===
As of 20 April 2019.

Note: Flags indicate national team as defined under FIFA eligibility rules; some limited exceptions apply. Players may hold more than one non-FIFA nationality.

No.	Pos.	Nation	Player
—	GK	FRA	Léonard Aggoune
—	GK	FRA	Nicolas Nimias
—	GK	FRA	Sikhou Silla
—	DF	FRA	Nicolas Brafine
—	DF	FRA	Abdoulaye Cissoko
—	DF	FRA	Kévin Coulibaly
—	DF	CMR	Benjamin Gouet
—	DF	FRA	Mehdi Hamelin
—	DF	FRA	Thomas Hippolyte
—	DF	FRA	Francis Nawe
—	DF	BEL	Sebastião Kangi
—	DF	FRA	Ladjie Soukouna
—	MF	FRA	Mehdi Admi

No.	Pos.	Nation	Player
—	MF	FRA	Alioune Ba
—	MF	FRA	Yann Beauregard
—	MF	FRA	Rachid Ben Mustapha
—	MF	FRA	Damien Durand
—	MF	FRA	Yannick Lekadou
—	MF	FRA	Franck N'Dinou
—	MF	FRA	Jordan Olivier
—	FW	FRA	Nazouam Ali
—	FW	FRA	Hamasili Camara
—	FW	FRA	Kevin Louaisil
—	FW	CMR	Dieudonné N'Somoto
—	FW	FRA	Aimé N'Simba

== Notable players ==
- (France) Patrice Evra (youth)
- (France) Thierry Henry (youth)
- (Democratic Republic of the Congo) Willy Kambwala (youth)
- (France) Anthony Martial (youth)
