= AS Choisy-le-Roi =

Football club in Choisy-le-Roi, France

Choisy-le-Roi
- Full name: Association Sportive de Choisy-le-Roi
- Short name: ASCR
- Founded: 1905
- Stadium: Stade Jean-Bouin
- League: Régional 2 Paris Île-de-France; Group C
- Website: http://www.as-choisy-le-roi.com

Association Sportive de Choisy-le-Roi is a football club based in Choisy-le-Roi, France. As of the 2024–25 season, it competes in the Régional 2 Paris Île-de-France, the seventh tier of the French football pyramid. The club's colours are light blue and white.

== History ==
Founded as SC Choisy-le-Roi in 1905, the club's best performance in the Coupe de France was in the 1991–92 edition of the tournament, when the team reached the round of 64 before being eliminated by Nîmes after a 2–0 loss. Dominique Bathenay coached Choisy-le-Roi from 1990 to 1994. In 1994, the club was renamed to AS Choisy-le-Roi. In the 2003–04 season, ASCR notably played in the Championnat de France Amateur, the fourth tier in France.

== Honours ==
AS Choisy-le-Roi honours
Honour	No.	Years
Division d'Honneur Paris Île-de-France	1	2001–02

== Notable players ==
- (France) Claude Anelka
- (France) Check Oumar Diakité
- (France) Djibril Diani
- (France) Édouard Duplan
- (France) Dominique Lokoli
- (France) David Lollia
- (France) Andreas Manga
- (France) Steve Ngoura (youth)
- (Cameroon) Allan Nyom
- (France) Jacques Siwe
- (France) Mathis Touho
- (Ivory Coast) Moussa Traoré
- (France) Philippe Troussier
- (France) Fabien Valéri
- (France) Lenny Vallier
- (France) Roger Vandooren
