= Gérard Cenzato =

French football player and manager (born 1951)

Personal information
- Date of birth: 10 January 1951 (age 75)
- Place of birth: Créteil, France
- Height: 1.78 m (5 ft 10 in)
- Positions: Defender; midfielder

Youth career
- 1961–1969: VGA Saint-Maur

Senior career*
Years	Team	Apps	(Gls)
1970	Paris-Joinville	4	(1)
1970–1971	Nancy	1	(0)
1971–1972	Le Mans	2	(0)
1972–1973	Sens		
1973–1974	Cholet		
1974–1977	Paris Saint-Germain	24	(0)
1977–1979	Paris FC	43	(1)
1979–1982	Fontainebleau		
1982–1983	Bagneaux-Nemours		
1983–1985	Étampes		

Managerial career
- 1982–1983: Bagneaux-Nemours
- 1983–1985: Étampes
- 1985–1987: Fontainebleau (youth)
- 1987–1988: Melun-Fontainebleau (cadet)
- 1988–1989: Melun-Dammarie (cadet)
- 1989–1990: Melun-Dammarie B
- Fontainebleau U17
- Fontainebleau B
- 2000–: Le Mée B
- –2005: Le Mée U13
- * Club domestic league appearances and goals

Gérard Cenzato (born 10 January 1951) is a French former professional football player and manager.

== Personal life ==
In 1979, Cenzato stopped playing football professionally, and returned to amateur football. He simultaneously took a role working for the town of Fontainebleau in the sports service, a role he still worked in as of 2007. During his coaching career, he crossed paths with and coached Clément Chantôme and Claude Makélélé at youth level. In 2005, he became a sports coach in Fontainebleau before retiring later in his life.
