= 2025–26 Coupe de France preliminary rounds, Paris-Île-de-France =

The 2025–26 Coupe de France preliminary rounds, Paris-Île-de-France was the qualifying competition to decide which teams from the leagues of the Paris-Île-de-France region of France took part in the main competition from the seventh round.

A total of eleven teams progressed from the Paris-Île-de-France preliminary rounds.

In 2024–25, both Football Club 93 Bobigny-Bagnolet-Gagny and JA Drancy progressed to the round of 64. Both were knocked out at that stage by Ligue One opposition, in Angers SCO and FC Nantes respectively.

== Draws and fixtures ==
In the Paris-Île-de-France region, the first two round usually take place before the end of season break. This season, the league announced on 8 April 2025 that 462 teams had entered the competition, and that the first round would take place in mid May and the second round in early June. Also announced was that the first round would consist of 176 ties, with one team exempted at this stage. A number of adjustments to the entry list were made before the date of the first round, resulting in an extra tie being added. On 13 May 2025 it was announced that there would be 131 ties in the second round, with the teams from the regional divisions entering at this stage.

The third round draw was published on 29 August 2025, with teams from Championnat National 3, including those relegated to Régional 1 at the end of the previous season, entering at this stage. 66 ties were drawn, with 13 teams receiving byes to the fourth round. The fourth round draw was published on 16 September 2025, with 41 ties drawn, including the three teams from Championnat National 2. The fifth round draw was published on 30 September 2025, with 22 matches drawn and the entry of the three teams from Championnat National. the sixth round draw was published on 15 October 2025.

=== First round ===
These matches were played between 11 and 15 May 2025, with one replayed 1 June 2025. Tiers refer to the 2024–25 season.

First Round Results: Paris-Île-de-France
| Tie no | Home team (Tier) | Score | Away team (Tier) |
|---|---|---|---|
| 1. | La Camillienne Sports 12ème (9) | 3–2 | CS Villetaneuse (10) |
| 2. | FC Solitaires Paris Est (10) | 1–3 | FC Nogent-sur-Marne (9) |
| 3. | Thorigny FC (10) | 1–4 | ES Marly-la-Ville (10) |
| 4. | Portugais Pontault-Combault (10) | 4–1 | AS Espoirs Grand Paris (11) |
| 5. | Marles AC (12) | 5–0 (Note: Tie won by means of forfeit.) | Boissy UJ (12) |
| 6. | AS Cheminots Ouest (11) | 3–3 (3–1 p) | Paris IFA (10) |
| 7. | AS Fontenay-aux-Roses (11) | 4–1 | Savigny-le-Temple FC (10) |
| 8. | Le Raincy FC (12) | 1–1 (4–5 p) | AS Champs-sur-Marne (11) |
| 9. | Gargenville Stade (10) | 6–3 | CSM Gennevilliers (9) |
| 10. | ES Brie Nord (11) | 1–5 | SO Rosny-sous-Bois (10) |
| 11. | AS Mesnil-Saint-Denis (13) | 1–3 | FC Boissy (10) |
| 12. | USC Lesigny (10) | 2–2 (3–1 p) | Draveil FC (9) |
| 13. | Bouffémont ACF (11) | 2–3 (Note: Crowd trouble occurred after the final whistle, and later the evening in the town, resulting in injuries. The league subsequently announced the disqualification of AS Carrières Grésillons from the competition.) | AS Carrières Grésillons (10) |
| 14. | AS Soisy-sur-Seine (12) | 0–0 (7–6 p) | US Ville d'Avray (10) |
| 15. | Cosmos Saint-Denis FC (10) | 1–7 | Poissy FC (9) |
| 16. | JS Villetaneuse (11) | 1–3 | FC Groslay (10) |
| 17. | FC Bois-le-Roi (12) | 1–0 | AC Gentilly (10) |
| 18. | Garches Vaucresson FC (13) | 2–2 (6–5 p) | FC Épinay Athletico (10) |
| 19. | Nicolaïte Chaillot Paris (10) | 1–3 | Étoile Bobigny (9) |
| 20. | FC Bourget (10) | 6–4 | FC Émerainville (10) |
| 21. | FC Chaville (11) | 0–1 | ES Montgeron (11) |
| 22. | AS Fourqueux (13) | 1–7 | AS Meudon (10) |
| 23. | US Vert-le-Grand (13) | 1–3 | CA Combs-la-Ville (10) |
| 24. | Dammarie City (10) | 1–3 | US Ris-Orangis (9) |
| 25. | AFDOM Les Bougainvillées (13) | 1–2 | JSC Pitray-Olier (10) |
| 26. | AS Nanteuil-lès-Meaux (10) | 8–1 | FC Puiseux-Louvres (11) |
| 27. | SC Dugny (11) | 2–1 | USM Villeparisis (9) |
| 28. | Vaux-le-Pénil La Rochette FC (11) | 2–3 | AS Orly (12) |
| 29. | FC Fontenay-le-Fleury (11) | 0–1 | FC Orsay-Bures (9) |
| 30. | Ablis FC Sud 78 (13) | 0–6 | AJ Étampoise (10) |
| 31. | RC Arpajonnais (13) | 2–4 | Bougival Foot (12) |
| 32. | Soisy-Andilly-Margency FC (10) | 3–4 | Pierrefitte FC (10) |
| 33. | ES Villabé (10) | 0–3 | ES Guyancourt (9) |
| 34. | ES Saint-Pathus-Oissery (11) | 0–0 (3–4 p) | AS Paris (9) |
| 35. | Antony Football Evolution (12) | 8–0 (Note: Match abandoned after 72 minutes, as Évry FC were reduced below the required number of players. Antony Football Evolution qualify.) | Évry FC (9) |
| 36. | Saint-Thibault-des-Vignes FC (9) | 0–2 (Note: Tie reversed from original draw.) | FC Moldavie (11) |
| 37. | Neuilly-Plaisance Sports (11) | 0–5 | RC Gonesse (9) |
| 38. | CSM Île-Saint-Denis (10) | 2–2 (3–4 p) | SO Houilles (10) |
| 39. | UJA Maccabi Paris Métropole (9) | 3–0 | US Quincy-Voisins FC (10) |
| 40. | US Jouy-en-Josas (11) | 6–1 | Guyane FC Paris (12) |
| 41. | FC Wissous (11) | 3–3 (9–8 p) | CA L'Haÿ-les-Roses (10) |
| 42. | Mimosa Mada-Sport (12) | 3–3 (4–3 p) | CS Ternes Paris-Ouest (12) |
| 43. | US Roissy-en-Brie (10) | 1–0 (Note: US Roissy-en-Brie penalised, reason unknown. OFC Couronnes qualify.) | OFC Couronnes (9) |
| 44. | ES Perray (13) | 1–3 | FC Trois Vallées (12) |
| 45. | CSM Eaubonne (10) | 0–3 | Sevran FC (9) |
| 46. | Aubergenville FC (9) | 1–4 | LSO Colombes (10) |
| 47. | FC Domont (12) | 5–1 | ES Vauxoise (11) |
| 48. | FC Gagny (11) | 2–1 | AS Collégien (11) |
| 49. | FC Boussy-Quincy (10) | 2–3 | FC Dammarie-lès-Lys (11) |
| 50. | Juvisy AF Essonne (12) | 1–3 | US Paris XIème (12) |
| 51. | Entente Pays du Limours (9) | 3–0 | FC Région Houdanaise (10) |
| 52. | Courtry Foot (11) | 0–3 | FC Écouen (9) |
| 53. | SCM Châtillonnais (12) | 3–6 | US Verneuil-sur-Seine (11) |
| 54. | Morsang-sur-Orge FC (10) | 6–0 | ES Pays de Bière (10) |
| 55. | Maisons-Laffitte FC (11) | 3–3 (4–5 p) | FC Grand Paris 21 (12) |
| 56. | ESM Thillay-Vaudherland (12) | 1–11 | AS Bondy (9) |
| 57. | Paris SC (9) | 2–2 (3–4 p) | CS Courtry Académie (10) |
| 58. | CSM Clamart Foot (10) | 8–0 | US Croissy (11) |
| 59. | ASM Fertoise (12) | 2–3 | AC Créteil (10) |
| 60. | AS Bucheloise (10) | 4–2 | AS Courdimanche (11) |
| 61. | CA Paris 14 (9) | 5–0 | AS Le Pin-Villevaude (10) |
| 62. | FC Coudraysien (11) | 5–2 | SC Briard (10) |
| 63. | USM Viroflay (12) | 0–5 | FC Étampes (10) |
| 64. | ES Nangis (11) | 2–3 | Bondoufle AC (10) |
| 65. | ES Moussy-le-Neuf (11) | 4–4 (2–3 p) | Atletico Bagnolet (9) |
| 66. | FC Longjumeau (10) | 2–2 (9–8 p) | ES Montreuil (10) |
| 67. | AS Neuville-sur-Oise (11) | 0–4 | FC Villetaneuse (11) |
| 68. | UF Clichois (10) | 3–3 (4–5 p) | UMS Pontault-Combault (10) |
| 69. | JS Pontoisienne (10) | 1–3 | US Chanteloup-les-Vignes (10) |
| 70. | TU Verrières-le-Buisson (10) | 1–0 | US Boissise-Pringy-Orgenoy (10) |
| 71. | Entente Beaumont Mours (12) | 1–0 | ES Parisienne (9) |
| 72. | Aigle Fertoise Boissy le Cutté (11) | 1–8 | FC Vallée 78 (10) |
| 73. | Cosmo Taverny (9) | 5–0 | AS Centre de Paris (10) |
| 74. | AS Sud Essonne (11) | 9–2 | Viking Club de Paris (11) |
| 75. | ASM Chambourcy (10) | 5–1 | FC Auvers-Ennery (11) |
| 76. | AS Saint-Mard (11) | 4–4 (4–2 p) | Espérance Paris 19ème (9) |
| 77. | USBS Épône (10) | 6–1 | SFC Champagne 95 (9) |
| 78. | FC Lissois (10) | 2–2 (6–5 p) | FC Moret-Veneux Sablons (10) |
| 79. | Portugais Académica Champigny (12) | 0–6 | Crécy FC (10) |
| 80. | Olympique Viarmes Asnières-sur-Oise (11) | 5–2 | CS Rosny-sur-Seine (10) |
| 81. | SC Épinay-sur-Orge (10) | 5–1 | FC Rambouillet Yvelines (10) |
| 82. | Interfoot 78 (13) | 1–9 | US Persan (9) |
| 83. | US Montesson (11) | 1–1 (3–4 p) | ES Seizième (9) |
| 84. | US Ézanville-Écouen (11) | 2–3 | AP Sainte-Mélanie (11) |
| 85. | US Marly-le-Roi (9) | 2–1 | ACS Cormeillais (9) |
| 86. | OC Gif Section Foot (11) | 1–2 | SFC Bailly Noisy-le-Roi (9) |
| 87. | FC Bonnières-sur-Seine Freneuse (12) | 1–5 | FC Asnières (11) |
| 88. | FCO Vigneux (11) | 5–0 | Gatinais Val de Loing FC (11) |
| 89. | SFC Canaverois (12) | 0–8 | CO Othis (10) |
| 90. | AGS Essarts-le-Roi (11) | 0–5 | FC Courcouronnes (9) |
| 91. | AS Issou (13) | 0–4 | FC Jouy-le-Moutier (9) |
| 92. | Olympique Loing (10) | 5–0 | FC Saint-Germain-Saintry-Saint-Pierre (10) |
| 93. | FC Champenois-Mammesien-Vernoucellois (11) | 2–6 | CS Mennecy (10) |
| 94. | FC Andrésy (12) | 0–3 | Épinay Académie (9) |
| 95. | FC Guignes (11) | 0–5 | Marcoussis Nozay La-Ville-du-Bois FC (9) |
| 96. | EFC Ecquevilly (12) | 4–1 | ÉS Paris (12) |
| 97. | CS Le Port-Marly (13) | 2–5 | USO Bezons (9) |
| 98. | Villebon SF (13) | 0–1 | ES Étang-Saint-Nom (13) |
| 99. | FC Villepinte (10) | 2–1 | Ménilmontant FC 1871 (11) |
| 100. | Brie FC (11) | 5–0 | Association Le Perou en Bleu (12) |
| 101. | FC Le Chesnay 78 (9) | 2–1 | Villeneuve AFC (10) |
| 102. | Val de France Foot (10) | 2–2 (1–4 p) | Paris Université Club (9) |
| 103. | SO Vertois (13) | 0–3 | Voisins FC (9) |
| 104. | AS Chaumontel Luzarches (12) | 1–1 (4–3 p) | Vinsky FC (11) |
| 105. | Drancy FC (11) | 2–3 | Osny FC (9) |
| 106. | AS Mesnil-le-Roi (11) | 4–4 (3–5 p) | US Montsoult-Baillet-Maffliers (11) |
| 107. | AS Saint-Germain-lès-Arpajon (12) | 2–4 | FC Mormant (10) |
| 108. | FS Esbly (11) | 0–5 | FC Goussainville (9) |
| 109. | FC Villennes-Orgeval (10) | 0–0 (2–3 p) | ES Herblay (10) |
| 110. | FC Coubronnais (10) | 3–1 | Coulommiers Brie (10) |
| 111. | FO Plaisirois (10) | 2–0 | FC Méry-Mériel (10) |
| 112. | FC Saint Vrain (10) | 0–2 | USM Malakoff (10) |
| 113. | US Ormesson-sur-Marne (9) | 1–3 | US Vaires (9) |
| 114. | CPS Provinois (11) | 1–2 | US Villeneuve Ablon (9) |
| 115. | Bann'Zanmi (11) | 1–2 | Stade de Vanves (9) |
| 116. | FC Brie Est (12) | 1–2 | Phare Sportive Zarzissien (11) |
| 117. | FC Vaujours (10) | 4–0 | USF Trilport (10) |
| 118. | ASL Janville Lardy (11) | 5–1 | US Avonnaise (10) |
| 119. | AS Menucourt (11) | 3–4 | OSC Élancourt (10) |
| 120. | FC Cosmo 77 (10) | 4–1 | ES Vitry (10) |
| 121. | ES Frettoise (11) | 0–1 | Racing Club 18ème (11) |
| 122. | FC Jouarre (12) | 0–3 | ES Villiers-sur-Marne (10) |
| 123. | AS Montigny-le-Bretonneux (10) | 5–0 | US Saclas-Méréville (11) |
| 124. | Générations SC (12) | 0–5 | RCP Fontainebleau (9) |
| 125. | Amicale Bocage (12) | 0–5 | CSM Bonneuil-sur-Marne (9) |
| 126. | FC Saint-Germain-en-Laye (10) | 6–3 | Pierrelaye FC (11) |
| 127. | Fontenay-en-Parisis FC (11) | 5–1 | AF Paris 18 (11) |
| 128. | AS Évry-Courcouronnes (11) | 0–1 | AS Bois d'Arcy (10) |
| 129. | ES Petit Anges Paris (12) | 1–7 | FC Brunoy (11) |
| 130. | Marolles FC (10) | 1–4 | ASA Montereau (9) |
| 131. | USO Athis-Mons (12) | 2–2 (5–4 p) | AS Maurepas (10) |
| 132. | ALJ Limay (11) | 5–0 | GAFE Plessis-Bouchard (11) |
| 133. | US Carrières-sur-Seine (11) | 0–0 (3–0 p) | FC Montmorency (11) |
| 134. | Marcouville City Cergy-Pontoise (11) | 2–2 (4–2 p) | FC Maurecourt (11) |
| 135. | AS La Plaine Victoire (12) | 5–2 | US Roissy-en-France (11) |
| 136. | AS Ballainvilliers (11) | 0–1 | ESC XVème (11) |
| 137. | JS Paris 10 (11) | 1–3 | FC Servon (9) |
| 138. | Ballancourt FC (13) | 0–5 | Sucy FC (9) |
| 139. | CS Cellois (10) | 1–0 | ES Saint-Prix (11) |
| 140. | AS Arnouville (11) | 5–0 | Olympique Mantes (12) |
| 141. | USA Feucherolles (11) | 2–0 | FC Antillais Paris 19ème (11) |
| 142. | Dourdan Sport (11) | 4–1 | FC Boissy (13) |
| 143. | FC Achères (12) | 5–2 | ÉSC Paris 20 (12) |
| 144. | FC Porcheville (13) | 1–0 | FC Deuil-Enghien (10) |
| 145. | FC Plateau Bréval Longnes (12) | 0–3 | AS Éragny FC (10) |
| 146. | Villeneuve-La-Garenne Foot 92 (13) | 1–4 | Triel AC (12) |
| 147. | Juziers FC (12) | 3–7 | AS Beauchamp (11) |
| 148. | USM Les Clayes-sous-Bois (12) | 0–8 | Sèvres FC 92 (9) |
| 149. | AF Pays de l'Ourcq (12) | 0–1 | CSA Kremlin-Bicêtre (10) |
| 150. | AS Guerville-Arnouville (12) | 4–3 | Magny-en-Vexin FC (11) |
| 151. | Fosses FU (11) | 1–4 | CS Pouchet Paris XVII (10) |
| 152. | Étoiles d'Auber (12) | 4–7 | AS Grenelle (12) |
| 153. | FC Portugais US Ris-Orangis (12) | 1–4 | COSM Arcueil (10) |
| 154. | AO Buc Foot (13) | 0–1 | Enfants de Passy Paris (10) |
| 155. | AS Coignières City FC (13) | 1–7 | Sport Yerres Benfica (13) |
| 156. | AS Morainvilliers (13) | 0–1 | AS Vexin (12) |
| 157. | Entente Longueville Sainte-Colombe Saint-Loup-de-Naud Soisy-Bouy (11) | 3–2 | FC Villiers-sur-Orge (12) |
| 158. | AC Villenoy (11) | 5–3 | Association Zenaga de Figuig (11) |
| 159. | Magny FC 78 (13) | 0–2 | Olympique Neuilly (9) |
| 160. | USD Ferrières-en-Brie (11) | 3–6 | AJ Limeil-Brévannes (10) |
| 161. | FC Villiers-Saint-Georges (11) | 5–5 (5–3 p) | ES Caudacienne (11) |
| 162. | FC La Plaine de France (12) | 2–0 | FC Saint-Mande (11) |
| 163. | FC Sceaux (13) | 2–0 | FC Varennes 77 (11) |
| 164. | SS Voltaire Châtenay-Malabry (9) | 12–0 | FC Nandy (11) |
| 165. | Villepreux FC (13) | 3–2 | USA Clichy (9) |
| 166. | FCM Vauréal (10) | 8–1 | AFC Saint-Cyr (13) |
| 167. | ES Paris XIII (10) | 4–1 | Bussy Saint-Georges FC (11) |
| 168. | Valenton FA (11) | 4–3 | AS Lieusaint (11) |
| 169. | FC Vitry 94 Academie (11) | 3–2 | Val d'Europe FC (9) |
| 170. | US Lognes (9) | 2–2 (3–4 p) | Championnet Sports Paris (10) |
| 171. | AJSC Nanterre (10) | 0–0 (Note: Match not played due to only 6 players from AJSC Nanterre being present at kickoff time. AJSC Nanterre penalised, CA Romainville qualify.) | CA Romainville (10) |
| 172. | Magny-le-Hongre FC (10) | 5–4 | Neuilly-Plaisance FC (10) |
| 173. | FC Gournay (11) | 0–0 (7–8 p) | US Lagny Messagers (11) |
| 174. | FC Bourg-La-Reine (12) | 5–0 | Association des Originaires du Portugal Corbeil (13) |
| 175. | US Ponthierry (10) | 0–2 | Breuillet FC (10) |
| 176. | Tremplin Foot (12) | 2–1 | AJ Antony (12) |
| 177. | ASC Vélizy (10) | 2–2 (5–6 p) (Note: The match was replayed on 1 June 2024 after a refereeing error in the original game played on 11 May 2025.) | CO Savigny (9) |

=== Second round ===
These matches were played between 29 May and 15 June 2025.<r Tiers refer to the 2024–25 season.

Second Round Results: Paris-Île-de-France
| Tie no | Home team (Tier) | Score | Away team (Tier) |
|---|---|---|---|
| 1. | AS Beauchamp (11) | 2–5 | AS La Plaine Victoire (12) |
| 2. | Courbevoie Sports (7) | 10–1 (Note: Tie reversed from original draw.) | FC Saint-Germain-en-Laye (10) |
| 3. | FC Courcouronnes (9) | 2–3 | AC Paris 15 (7) |
| 4. | US Montsoult-Baillet-Maffliers (11) | 0–3 | CSM Puteaux (7) |
| 5. | Breuillet FC (10) | 1–1 (4–5 p) | Le Mée Sports (6) |
| 6. | ES Étang-Saint-Nom (13) | 1–2 | Tremplin Foot (12) |
| 7. | JS Suresnes (8) | 2–3 | US Villejuif (6) |
| 8. | US Persan (9) | 2–2 (3–2 p) | USBS Épône (10) |
| 9. | FC Montfermeil (7) | 6–3 | CA Combs-la-Ville (10) |
| 10. | FC Asnières (11) | 3–2 | US Hardricourt (7) |
| 11. | FC Mormant (10) | 0–6 | Thiais FC (8) |
| 12. | US Verneuil-sur-Seine (11) | 0–1 | CO Les Ulis (6) |
| 13. | Olympique Neuilly (9) | 2–3 | FC Les Lilas (7) |
| 14. | US Lagny Messagers (11) | 1–1 (1–4 p) | UJA Maccabi Paris Métropole (9) |
| 15. | FC Dammarie-lès-Lys (11) | 7–1 | AS Sud Essonne (11) |
| 16. | Bondoufle AC (10) | 1–3 | ES Nanterre (6) |
| 17. | Sport Yerres Benfica (13) | 5–0 | walkover (Note: AS Carrières Grésillons disqualified after league investigation into first round match.) |
| 18. | Flamboyants Villepinte (8) | 5–0 | CA Paris-Charenton (7) |
| 19. | Gargenville Stade (10) | 0–0 (4–3 p) | Saint-Brice FC (6) |
| 20. | CSM Bonneuil-sur-Marne (9) | 3–3 (3–2 p) | FC Vaujours (10) |
| 21. | ES Marly-la-Ville (10) | 1–0 | FC Villepinte (10) |
| 22. | Sèvres FC 92 (9) | 0–1 | FC Igny (7) |
| 23. | US Chanteloup-les-Vignes (10) | 1–1 (3–1 p) | AS Fontenay-aux-Roses (11) |
| 24. | FC Moldavie (11) | 1–2 | La Camillienne Sports 12ème (9) |
| 25. | AS Vexin (12) | 1–3 | Neauphle-le-Château-Pontchartrain RC 78 (7) |
| 26. | AS Guerville-Arnouville (12) | 1–5 | FC Villiers-le-Bel (7) |
| 27. | Paray FC (8) | 0–1 | Claye-Souilly SF (6) |
| 28. | LSO Colombes (10) | 7–1 | Fontenay-en-Parisis FC (11) |
| 29. | AP Sainte-Mélanie (11) | 4–3 | USO Athis-Mons (12) |
| 30. | ALJ Limay (11) | 0–3 | AAS Sarcelles (6) |
| 31. | Marcoussis Nozay La-Ville-du-Bois FC (9) | 1–2 | ES Trappes (7) |
| 32. | Championnet Sports Paris (10) | 5–0 | FC Villiers-Saint-Georges (11) |
| 33. | AS Bucheloise (10) | 1–5 | ES Colombienne (7) |
| 34. | Mitry Compans Goelly (8) | 3–1 | CA Paris 14 (9) |
| 35. | AS Bois d'Arcy (10) | 0–3 | Olympique Adamois (6) |
| 36. | AS Meudon (10) | 4–5 | Conflans FC (7) |
| 37. | AS Nanteuil-lès-Meaux (10) | 0–6 | Tremblay FC (7) |
| 38. | Bougival Foot (12) | 4–4 (4–2 p) | FC Bourg-La-Reine (12) |
| 39. | RC Gonesse (9) | 4–3 | CS Meaux (7) |
| 40. | Pierrefitte FC (10) | 2–8 | Sartrouville FC (7) |
| 41. | Paris Alésia FC (8) | 2–2 (3–1 p) | Cosmo Taverny (9) |
| 42. | FC Villetaneuse (11) | 3–2 | Mimosa Mada-Sport (12) |
| 43. | ES Montgeron (11) | 3–4 | AC Houilles (6) |
| 44. | CO Cachan (9) | 3–3 (3–5 p) | ASC La Courneuve (8) |
| 45. | Crécy FC (10) | 2–1 | FC Coubronnais (10) |
| 46. | SO Houilles (10) | 1–1 (3–4 p) | Cergy Pontoise FC (6) |
| 47. | Enfants de Passy Paris (10) | 3–0 | FC Vitry 94 Academie (11) |
| 48. | FCO Vigneux (11) | 2–3 | FC Melun (7) |
| 49. | US Carrières-sur-Seine (11) | 1–6 | AS Ermont (8) |
| 50. | CS Mennecy (10) | 0–3 | US Sénart-Moissy (6) |
| 51. | AC Créteil (10) | 3–2 | ASL Janville Lardy (11) |
| 52. | FC Mantois 78 (6) | 6–3 | AS Éragny FC (10) |
| 53. | CS Pouchet Paris XVII (10) | 1–2 | OFC Pantin (8) |
| 54. | FC Vallée 78 (10) | 1–4 | Montrouge FC 92 (6) |
| 55. | FC Domont (12) | 1–1 (6–7 p) | Olympique Noisy-le-Sec (7) |
| 56. | Dourdan Sport (11) | 1–4 | CSM Clamart Foot (10) |
| 57. | FC Trois Vallées (12) | 0–2 | ASF Le Perreux (7) |
| 58. | CO Othis (10) | 1–7 | Val Yerres Crosne AF (6) |
| 59. | Entente Pays du Limours (9) | 1–1 (6–5 p) | FO Plaisirois (10) |
| 60. | SC Épinay-sur-Orge (10) | 1–8 | CA Vitry (6) |
| 61. | RCP Fontainebleau (9) | 4–3 | FC Nogent-sur-Marne (9) |
| 62. | AC Villenoy (11) | 1–7 | Atletico Bagnolet (9) |
| 63. | US Fontenay-sous-Bois (8) | 1–1 (2–3 p) | AS Paris (9) |
| 64. | Magny-le-Hongre FC (10) | 0–4 | Villemomble SF (7) |
| 65. | FC Goussainville (9) | 1–2 | Sevran FC (9) |
| 66. | ASM Chambourcy (10) | 1–4 | Argenteuil FC (7) |
| 67. | Olympique Loing (10) | 1–6 | FC Longjumeau (10) |
| 68. | UMS Pontault-Combault (10) | 3–3 (7–6 p) | CO Vincennes (7) |
| 69. | CS Cellois (10) | 0–1 | US Palaiseau (7) |
| 70. | ES Guyancourt (9) | 0–4 | ES Seizième (9) |
| 71. | Entente Longueville Sainte-Colombe Saint-Loup-de-Naud Soisy-Bouy (11) | 2–6 | Sucy FC (9) |
| 72. | FC Lissois (10) | 1–1 (2–4 p) | US Rungis (7) |
| 73. | Osny FC (9) | 2–0 | Stade de Vanves (9) |
| 74. | FCM Garges-lès-Gonesse (8) | 2–5 | Épinay Académie (9) |
| 75. | EFC Ecquevilly (12) | 1–5 | FC Sceaux (13) |
| 76. | SO Rosny-sous-Bois (10) | 0–9 | Amicale Villeneuve-la-Garenne (7) |
| 77. | AJ Étampoise (10) | 1–2 | AS Choisy-le-Roi (7) |
| 78. | CS Courtry Académie (10) | 0–3 | Blanc-Mesnil SF (7) |
| 79. | Villepreux FC (13) | 1–4 | CSA Kremlin-Bicêtre (10) |
| 80. | US Ris-Orangis (9) | 1–2 | Voisins FC (9) |
| 81. | Salésienne de Paris (8) | 0–3 | Montreuil FC (6) |
| 82. | FC Cosmo 77 (10) | – (Note: The match was not played. FC Cosmo 77 presented a document claiming to be from the town hall of Montry, stating that the pitch and facilities were closed on the scheduled day. This was found by the league not to be authentic. FC Cosmo 77 penalised, FC Bourget qualify.) | FC Bourget (10) |
| 83. | Antony Football Evolution (12) | 11–0 | US Paris XIème (12) |
| 84. | FCM Vauréal (10) | 1–2 | CSL Aulnay (7) |
| 85. | Olympique Viarmes Asnières-sur-Oise (11) | 4–1 | ES Stains (8) |
| 86. | FC Étampes (10) | 1–5 | US Jouy-en-Josas (11) |
| 87. | ES Herblay (10) | 5–0 (Note: Tie won by means of forfeit.) | CA Romainville (10) |
| 88. | OSC Élancourt (10) | 0–1 | AC Boulogne-Billancourt (7) |
| 89. | US Marly-le-Roi (9) | 4–2 | USO Bezons (9) |
| 90. | SFC Bailly Noisy-le-Roi (9) | 1–3 | AF Garenne-Colombes (7) |
| 91. | Racing Club 18ème (11) | 1–1 (0–3 p) | ASA Issy (8) |
| 92. | Champigny FC 94 (7) | 2–2 (4–3 p) | Enfants de la Goutte d'Or (8) |
| 93. | AS Arnouville (11) | 6–6 (4–2 p) | SC Dugny (11) |
| 94. | FC Jouy-le-Moutier (9) | 0–0 (5–4 p) | Saint-Denis US (6) |
| 95. | Garches Vaucresson FC (13) | 0–2 | US Grigny (7) |
| 96. | FC Boissy (10) | 0–7 | FC Plessis-Robinson (6) |
| 97. | ESC XVème (11) | 1–2 | AS Chelles (8) |
| 98. | Brie FC (11) | 1–9 | Étoile Bobigny (9) |
| 99. | FC Gagny (11) | 8–0 | Marles AC (12) |
| 100. | FC Servon (9) | 2–0 | Valenton FA (11) |
| 101. | ES Villiers-sur-Marne (10) | 4–3 | JSC Pitray-Olier (10) |
| 102. | US Vaires (9) | 3–3 (2–4 p) | Stade de l'Est Pavillonnais (8) |
| 103. | FC Franconville (8) | 3–2 | FC Le Chesnay 78 (9) |
| 104. | FC Wissous (11) | 2–2 (5–6 p) | FC Issy-les-Moulineaux (8) |
| 105. | US Villeneuve Ablon (9) | 3–1 | FC Ozoir-la-Ferrière 77 (8) |
| 106. | FC Coudraysien (11) | 2–1 | Saint-Cloud FC (8) |
| 107. | AS Soisy-sur-Seine (12) | 1–4 | ES Paris XIII (10) |
| 108. | Triel AC (12) | 2–1 | Morsang-sur-Orge FC (10) |
| 109. | AS Orly (12) | 0–3 | FC Livry-Gargan (8) |
| 110. | FC La Plaine de France (12) | 1–8 | Élan Chevilly-Larue (8) |
| 111. | SS Voltaire Châtenay-Malabry (9) | 2–1 | AJ Limeil-Brévannes (10) |
| 112. | Phare Sportive Zarzissien (11) | 1–1 (2–4 p) | AS Saint-Mard (11) |
| 113. | AS Chaumontel Luzarches (12) | 0–1 | FC Rueil Malmaison (8) |
| 114. | AS Cheminots Ouest (11) | 3–2 | ES Viry-Châtillon (8) |
| 115. | FC Achères (12) | 0–9 | FC Saint-Leu (7) |
| 116. | FC Porcheville (13) | 4–2 | Marcouville City Cergy-Pontoise (11) |
| 117. | COSM Arcueil (10) | 0–2 | Espérance Aulnay (6) |
| 118. | USC Lesigny (10) | 0–3 | RFC Argenteuil (8) |
| 119. | FC Grand Paris 21 (12) | 0–6 | Portugais Pontault-Combault (10) |
| 120. | FC Brunoy (11) | 4–1 | FC Bois-le-Roi (12) |
| 121. | Paris Université Club (9) | 5–3 | AS Bondy (9) |
| 122. | Saint-Maur VGA (8) | 3–1 | FC Orsay-Bures (9) |
| 123. | Entente Beaumont Mours (12) | 4–2 | AS Grenelle (12) |
| 124. | Poissy FC (9) | 4–0 | TU Verrières-le-Buisson (10) |
| 125. | FC Groslay (10) | 0–2 | OFC Les Mureaux (6) |
| 126. | ASA Montereau (9) | 2–2 (4–5 p) | Saint-Michel FC 91 (8) |
| 127. | AS Montigny-le-Bretonneux (10) | 1–3 | FC Morangis-Chilly (7) |
| 128. | ES Cesson Vert Saint-Denis (8) | 1–2 | COM Bagneux (7) |
| 129. | SC Gretz-Tournan (7) | 2–1 | Noisy-le-Grand FC (8) |
| 130. | USA Feucherolles (11) | 3–4 | FC Écouen (9) |
| 131. | CO Savigny (9) | 2–1 | OFC Couronnes (9) |
| 132. | USM Malakoff (10) | 1–4 (Note: The match was originally scheduled for 1 June 2025, but on inspection the referee declared the pitch dangerous. The league ordered the game to be rearranged for 15 June 2025.) | FC Massy 91 (8) |
| 133. | FC Maisons Alfort (8) | 4–0 (Note: The match was originally scheduled for 1 June 2025, but on inspection the referee declared the pitch unplayable as it was covered in goose droppings, and there was no access to the changing rooms. The league ordered the game to reversed and rearranged for 15 June 2025.) | AS Champs-sur-Marne (11) |

=== Third round ===
These matches were played on 13 and 14 September 2025.

Third Round Results: Paris-Île-de-France
| Tie no | Home team (Tier) | Score | Away team (Tier) |
|---|---|---|---|
| 1. | Atletico Bagnolet (9) | 4–3 | Grigny Football 91 (7) |
| 2. | Stade de l'Est Pavillonnais (8) | 0–3 | US Ivry (5) |
| 3. | US Marly-le-Roi (9) | 0–2 | Olympique Noisy-le-Sec (7) |
| 4. | Osny FC (9) | 0–2 | ES Colombienne (6) |
| 5. | FC Porcheville (12) | 3–1 | AS Cheminots Ouest (11) |
| 6. | US Chanteloup-les-Vignes (10) | 2–0 | FC Dammarie-lès-Lys (11) |
| 7. | Le Mée Sports (6) | 2–1 | Élan Chevilly-Larue (7) |
| 8. | AS Ermont (8) | 1–5 | FC Montfermeil (7) |
| 9. | Gargenville Stade (10) | 2–2 (2–3 p) | AAS Sarcelles (6) |
| 10. | Bougival Foot (12) | 0–9 | CO Savigny (9) |
| 11. | Saint-Maur VGA (8) | 3–0 | AC Boulogne-Billancourt (7) |
| 12. | Tremplin Foot (12) | 0–3 | AC Paris 15 (7) |
| 13. | FC Franconville (9) | 1–2 | OFC Les Mureaux (6) |
| 14. | CSM Puteaux (7) | 0–2 | Sainte-Geneviève Sports (5) |
| 15. | SS Voltaire Châtenay-Malabry (9) | 1–1 (5–4 p) | ES Paris XIII (10) |
| 16. | Courbevoie Sports (6) | 2–0 | CSL Aulnay (7) |
| 17. | Tremblay FC (7) | 0–0 (3–4 p) | FC Villiers-le-Bel (7) |
| 18. | Sevran FC (8) | 1–1 (3–5 p) | ASF Le Perreux (7) |
| 19. | FC Brunoy (11) | 1–2 | Claye-Souilly SF (6) |
| 20. | SC Gretz-Tournan (7) | 0–3 | JA Drancy (5) |
| 21. | Entente Pays du Limours (9) | 0–3 | US Sénart-Moissy (7) |
| 22. | CSM Bonneuil-sur-Marne (9) | 0–1 | AS Chatou (6) |
| 23. | Blanc-Mesnil SF (7) | 3–0 | RFC Argenteuil (8) |
| 24. | AS Chelles (9) | 4–4 (4–3 p) | FC Igny (7) |
| 25. | RCP Fontainebleau (9) | 0–3 | ESA Linas-Montlhéry (5) |
| 26. | RC Gonesse (9) | 3–1 | FC Maisons Alfort (8) |
| 27. | FC Melun (6) | 4–2 (Note: Tie reversed from original draw.) | FC Sceaux (13) |
| 28. | FC Les Lilas (7) | 1–1 (2–4 p) | Val Yerres Crosne AF (6) |
| 29. | CSA Kremlin-Bicêtre (10) | 0–3 (Note: Tie won by means of forfeit.) | CS Brétigny (5) |
| 30. | FC Coudraysien (11) | 0–1 | ES Trappes (7) |
| 31. | Épinay Académie (9) | 4–0 | Championnet Sports Paris (10) |
| 32. | Sport Yerres Benfica (13) | 0–7 | La Camillienne Sports 12ème (9) |
| 33. | AS Arnouville (11) | 3–3 (5–3 p) | ES Seizième (9) |
| 34. | Argenteuil FC (8) | 2–1 | Espérance Aulnay (6) |
| 35. | FC Saint-Leu (7) | 0–1 | SFC Neuilly-sur-Marne (5) |
| 36. | US Villeneuve Ablon (9) | 2–6 | Cergy Pontoise FC (7) |
| 37. | ES Marly-la-Ville (10) | 1–3 | Villemomble SF (7) |
| 38. | AS Choisy-le-Roi (8) | 0–2 | FC Plessis-Robinson (6) |
| 39. | Antony Football Evolution (12) | 0–6 | FC Morangis-Chilly (7) |
| 40. | Paris Alésia FC (8) | 0–4 | ES Nanterre (7) |
| 41. | Thiais FC (8) | 1–2 (2–4 p) | FCM Aubervilliers (5) |
| 42. | FC Jouy-le-Moutier (9) | 0–6 | Saint-Michel FC 91 (8) |
| 43. | FC Villetaneuse (none) | 0–3 | ASA Issy (8) |
| 44. | FC Issy-les-Moulineaux (8) | 1–2 | ES Herblay (9) |
| 45. | Champigny FC 94 (7) | 0–1 | FC Massy 91 (8) |
| 46. | FC Longjumeau (10) | 1–0 | CSM Clamart Foot (9) |
| 47. | Flamboyants Villepinte (7) | 0–2 | US Villejuif (6) |
| 48. | Paris Université Club (8) | 0–4 | AC Houilles (6) |
| 49. | US Rungis (7) | 1–2 | Sartrouville FC (7) |
| 50. | ES Villiers-sur-Marne (9) | 0–3 | US Torcy (5) |
| 51. | Voisins FC (10) | 1–2 | Mitry Compans Goelly (7) |
| 52. | FC Gagny (10) | 0–3 | US Palaiseau (7) |
| 53. | Triel AC (11) | 0–0 (4–1 p) | Entente SSG (6) |
| 54. | ASC La Courneuve (8) | 0–3 | Racing Club de France Football (5) |
| 55. | Amicale Villeneuve-la-Garenne (7) | 2–0 | AS Saint-Ouen-l'Aumône (5) |
| 56. | US Jouy-en-Josas (10) | 3–5 | LSO Colombes (9) |
| 57. | FC Livry-Gargan (9) | 2–8 | FC Mantois 78 (6) |
| 58. | FC Bourget (10) | 0–3 | Poissy FC (8) |
| 59. | AS Paris (9) | 0–0 (4–5 p) | Conflans FC (7) |
| 60. | Étoile Bobigny (9) | 3–1 | Portugais Pontault-Combault (10) |
| 61. | FC Asnières (11) | 2–4 | AC Créteil (10) |
| 62. | UJA Maccabi Paris Métropole (9) | 3–4 | COM Bagneux (8) |
| 63. | FC Servon (9) | 0–5 | Montreuil FC (6) |
| 64. | FC Écouen (9) | 0–2 | AF Garenne-Colombes (8) |
| 65. | Crécy FC (10) | 2–1 | AP Sainte-Mélanie (10) |
| 66. | Olympique Pantin-Bobigny (8) | 1–4 | Sucy FC (9) |

=== Fourth round ===
These matches were played on 27 and 28 September 2025.

Fourth Round Results: Paris-Île-de-France
| Tie no | Home team (Tier) | Score | Away team (Tier) |
|---|---|---|---|
| 1. | FC Longjumeau (10) | 2–0 | AS Arnouville (11) |
| 2. | Crécy FC (10) | 1–3 | AAS Sarcelles (6) |
| 3. | ASF Le Perreux (7) | 5–2 | AF Garenne-Colombes (8) |
| 4. | AC Paris 15 (7) | 1–1 (5–3 p) | Saint-Maur VGA (8) |
| 5. | Enfants de Passy Paris (10) | 0–3 | Neauphle-le-Château-Pontchartrain RC 78 (8) |
| 6. | US Persan (9) | 0–3 | ES Herblay (9) |
| 7. | US Sénart-Moissy (7) | 2–1 | AS Chatou (6) |
| 8. | ES Trappes (7) | 1–6 | US Lusitanos Saint-Maur (4) |
| 9. | Étoile Bobigny (9) | 1–1 (5–4 p) | Conflans FC (7) |
| 10. | FC Montfermeil (7) | 3–0 | Poissy FC (8) |
| 11. | Sucy FC (9) | 0–1 | US Torcy (5) |
| 12. | US Chanteloup-les-Vignes (10) | 0–6 | FC 93 Bobigny-Bagnolet-Gagny (4) |
| 13. | AS Saint-Mard (11) | 0–6 | LSO Colombes (9) |
| 14. | FC Plessis-Robinson (6) | 3–3 (3–4 p) | JA Drancy (5) |
| 15. | Montreuil FC (6) | 2–1 | Courbevoie Sports (6) |
| 16. | Claye-Souilly SF (6) | 0–3 | Racing Club de France Football (5) |
| 17. | AC Créteil (10) | 3–5 | Montrouge FC 92 (6) |
| 18. | Entente Beaumont Mours (11) | 0–5 | Amicale Villeneuve-la-Garenne (7) |
| 19. | Épinay Académie (9) | 1–6 | Sainte-Geneviève Sports (5) |
| 20. | Saint-Michel FC 91 (8) | 1–1 (5–4 p) | FC Villiers-le-Bel (7) |
| 21. | CA Vitry (7) | 3–2 | US Palaiseau (7) |
| 22. | AS Chelles (9) | 0–4 | ESA Linas-Montlhéry (5) |
| 23. | Villemomble SF (7) | 2–1 | FC Morangis-Chilly (7) |
| 24. | Olympique Adamois (7) | 3–1 | Blanc-Mesnil SF (7) |
| 25. | Val Yerres Crosne AF (6) | 1–3 | AC Houilles (6) |
| 26. | FC Porcheville (12) | 1–4 | COM Bagneux (8) |
| 27. | SFC Neuilly-sur-Marne (5) | 0–2 | US Ivry (5) |
| 28. | OFC Les Mureaux (6) | 1–2 | FC Melun (6) |
| 29. | Mitry Compans Goelly (7) | 3–0 | FC Rueil Malmaison (8) |
| 30. | UMS Pontault-Combault (10) | 0–3 | CS Brétigny (5) |
| 31. | Atletico Bagnolet (9) | 3–2 | RC Gonesse (9) |
| 32. | Sartrouville FC (7) | 3–1 | US Villejuif (6) |
| 33. | Triel AC (11) | 4–5 | AS La Plaine Victoire (11) |
| 34. | ES Nanterre (7) | 1–3 | Union Sportive Créteil Football (4) |
| 35. | FC Mantois 78 (6) | 4–1 | Olympique Noisy-le-Sec (7) |
| 36. | FCM Aubervilliers (5) | 3–2 | Le Mée Sports (6) |
| 37. | FC Massy 91 (8) | 0–6 | Argenteuil FC (8) |
| 38. | SS Voltaire Châtenay-Malabry (9) | 0–3 | Cergy Pontoise FC (7) |
| 39. | Olympique Viarmes Asnières-sur-Oise (11) | 0–11 | ES Colombienne (6) |
| 40. | CO Savigny (9) | 2–4 | CO Les Ulis (6) |
| 41. | La Camillienne Sports 12ème (9) | 0–1 | ASA Issy (8) |

=== Fifth round ===
These matches were played on 11 and 12 October 2025.

Fifth Round Results: Paris-Île-de-France
| Tie no | Home team (Tier) | Score | Away team (Tier) |
|---|---|---|---|
| 1. | ASF Le Perreux (7) | 2–2 (1–3 p) | Paris 13 Atletico (3) |
| 2. | US Ivry (5) | 1–0 | FC Versailles 78 (3) |
| 3. | FC Montfermeil (7) | 2–2 (0–2 p) | FC 93 Bobigny-Bagnolet-Gagny (4) |
| 4. | Neauphle-le-Château-Pontchartrain RC 78 (8) | 1–3 | Union Sportive Créteil Football (4) |
| 5. | AC Paris 15 (7) | 0–1 | JA Drancy (5) |
| 6. | Atletico Bagnolet (9) | 0–0 (6–7 p) | Racing Club de France Football (5) |
| 7. | US Torcy (5) | 2–0 | CS Brétigny (5) |
| 8. | ES Colombienne (6) | 2–0 | US Sénart-Moissy (7) |
| 9. | Sainte-Geneviève Sports (5) | 1–1 (3–4 p) | FC Mantois 78 (6) |
| 10. | COM Bagneux (8) | 2–5 | AAS Sarcelles (6) |
| 11. | ESA Linas-Montlhéry (5) | 6–1 | Montrouge FC 92 (6) |
| 12. | CA Vitry (7) | 2–2 (4–5 p) | Montreuil FC (6) |
| 13. | Mitry Compans Goelly (7) | 9–1 (Note: Tie reversed form original draw.) | AS La Plaine Victoire (11) |
| 14. | Amicale Villeneuve-la-Garenne (7) | 1–0 | Sartrouville FC (7) |
| 15. | Cergy Pontoise FC (7) | 3–1 | AC Houilles (6) |
| 16. | Villemomble SF (7) | 1–2 | US Lusitanos Saint-Maur (4) |
| 17. | Olympique Adamois (7) | 0–4 | FC Fleury 91 (3) |
| 18. | ASA Issy (8) | 0–1 | FC Melun (6) |
| 19. | ES Herblay (9) | 2–2 (3–5 p) | FCM Aubervilliers (5) |
| 20. | Étoile Bobigny (9) | 2–1 | CO Les Ulis (6) |
| 21. | LSO Colombes (9) | 1–2 (Note: Saint-Michel FC 91 penalised for fielding an ineligible player, LSO Colombes qualified.) | Saint-Michel FC 91 (8) |
| 22. | FC Longjumeau (10) | 1–2 | Argenteuil FC (8) |

=== Sixth round ===
These matches were played on 25 and 26 October 2025.

Sixth Round Results: Paris-Île-de-France
| Tie no | Home team (Tier) | Score | Away team (Tier) |
|---|---|---|---|
| 1. | Argenteuil FC (8) | 1–6 | FC Fleury 91 (3) |
| 2. | AAS Sarcelles (6) | 2–3 | Paris 13 Atletico (3) |
| 3. | US Lusitanos Saint-Maur (4) | 1–1 (4–2 p) | Union Sportive Créteil Football (4) |
| 4. | FC 93 Bobigny-Bagnolet-Gagny (4) | 0–1 | JA Drancy (5) |
| 5. | Étoile Bobigny (9) | 1–1 (4–2 p) | ESA Linas-Montlhéry (5) |
| 6. | LSO Colombes (9) | 2–3 | US Ivry (5) |
| 7. | Cergy Pontoise FC (7) | 0–1 | US Torcy (5) |
| 8. | Montreuil FC (6) | 1–1 (4–1 p) | FC Mantois 78 (6) |
| 9. | Racing Club de France Football (5) | 3–0 | ES Colombienne (6) |
| 10. | FCM Aubervilliers (5) | 3–0 | FC Melun (6) |
| 11. | Amicale Villeneuve-la-Garenne (7) | 3–0 | Mitry Compans Goelly (7) |
