= 2021–22 Coupe de France preliminary rounds, Paris-Île-de-France =

The 2021–22 Coupe de France preliminary rounds, Paris-Île-de-France was the qualifying competition to decide which teams from the leagues of the Paris-Île-de-France region of France took part in the main competition from the seventh round.

A total of eleven teams qualified from the Paris-Île-de-France preliminary rounds. In 2020–21, Red Star progressed furthest in the main competition, reaching the round of 16 before narrowly losing against Lyon on penalties.

== Draws and fixtures ==
On 27 July 2021, the league announced that 485 clubs from the region had entered the competition. It was also announced that 360 district level clubs would enter at the first round stage, with 8 exempt to the second round stage.

=== First round ===
These matches were played on 29 August 2021.

First round results: Paris-Île-de-France
Tie no	Home team (tier)	Score	Away team (tier)
1.	Bondoufle AC (11)	1–3	FC Nogent-sur-Marne (10)
2.	US Chaumes Guignes (11)	0–3 (Note: Tie won by means of forfeit.)	FC Bry (11)
3.	AS Angervilliers (12)	3–2	Alliance 77 Évry-Grégy-Solers (12)
4.	Les Petits Pains (13)	2–3	FC Jouy-le-Moutier (10)
5.	AS Sud Essonne (10)	3–0	ES La Fôret (11)
6.	Pierrefitte FC (11)	1–4	FC Herblay-sur-Seine (9)
7.	AS Vexin (11)	0–3	FC Asnières (11)
8.	Magny-le-Hongre FC (11)	3–0	Bann'Zanmi (11)
9.	USM Malakoff (11)	10–0	Portugais Académica Champigny (11)
10.	AC Villenoy (11)	0–3	Guyane FC Paris (11)
11.	Olympique Montigny (9)	1–1 (2–4 p)	Enfants de la Goutte d'Or (10)
12.	AS Éclair de Puiseux (12)	0–3	FC Portugais Plessis Placy (11)
13.	FC Plateau Bréval Longnes (13)	3–1	ACS Cormeillais (9)
14.	US Lognes (9)	1–2	Soisy-Andilly-Margency FC (9)
15.	OSC Élancourt (10)	4–1	TU Verrières-le-Buisson (9)
16.	FC Cosmo 77 (11)	2–0	AS Paris 18è (11)
17.	SS Voltaire Châtenay-Malabry (10)	3–3 (4–2 p)	US Avonnaise (9)
18.	Draveil FC (10)	3–0	FC Guignes (11)
19.	Brie FC (11)	2–3	FC Puiseux-Louvres (11)
20.	Marles AC (12)	0–3	ES Villiers-sur-Marne (10)
21.	FC Champenois-Mammesien-Vernoucellois (11)	0–3	Grigny FC (12)
22.	Parmain AC (12)	2–4	Neuilly-Plaisance Sports (11)
23.	CO Savigny (9)	9–0	SC Briard (10)
24.	Drancy FC (12)	0–3	AS Outre-Mer du Bois l'Abbé (11)
25.	US Villecresnes (10)	1–2	Pays Créçois FC (9)
26.	AS Courdimanche (11)	3–2	AJ Mézières (11)
27.	Magny FC 78 (12)	3–0	FC Antillais de Vigneux-sur-Seine (13)
28.	Lions FC Magnanville (13)	3–4	FCM Vauréal (10)
29.	Fosses FU (11)	0–1	US Changis-Saint-Jean-Ussy (10)
30.	USF Trilport (10)	3–0	US Ézanville-Écouen (10)
31.	CA L'Haÿ-les-Roses (11)	1–4	CA Combs-la-Ville (9)
32.	US Roissy-en-France (10)	1–2	AS Nanteuil-lès-Meaux (10)
33.	ASL Mesnil Saint-Denis (13)	1–3	FC Villiers-sur-Orge (13)
34.	US Boissise-Pringy-Orgenoy (10)	1–0	AJ Limeil-Brévannes (9)
35.	US Verneuil-sur-Seine (10)	3–0	AS Meudon (9)
36.	CS Pouchet Paris XVII (11)	3–0	USC Mantes (12)
37.	FC Épinay Athletico (11)	3–0	CSA Kremlin-Bicêtre (11)
38.	FC Romainville (10)	4–0	US Roissy-en-Brie (9)
39.	FC Portugais US Ris-Orangis (11)	3–0	ES Saint-Germain-Laval (11)
40.	FC Porcheville (13)	5–4	Enfants de Gennevilliers (13)
41.	FC Saint Vrain (11)	10–3	Dammarie City (12)
42.	US Montesson (10)	1–4	USA Clichy (10)
43.	Espérance Paris 19ème (9)	4–1	FC Saint-Mande (10)
44.	SO Vertois (13)	0–2	Enfants de Passy Paris (11)
45.	AS Neuville-sur-Oise (12)	0–3	Cosmos Saint-Denis FC (10)
46.	ESC XVème (11)	2–3	FC Villepinte (10)
47.	GAFE Plessis-Bouchard (12)	3–5	Olympique Mantes (13)
48.	FA Le Raincy (10)	3–0	LSO Colombes (9)
49.	Gargenville Stade (9)	2–2 (6–5 p)	JS Villetaneuse (10)
50.	AS Fourqueux (13)	1–2	Entente Pays du Limours (12)
51.	AS Fontenaisienne (13)	3–1	Trops FC (12)
52.	FC Solitaires Paris Est (9)	3–0	US Ormesson-sur-Marne (10)
53.	Juziers FC (13)	0–4	Amicale Villeneuve-la-Garenne (9)
54.	ES Vitry (9)	5–3	AS Paris (9)
55.	Sevran FC (10)	0–3	La Camillienne Sports 12ème (9)
56.	ES Plateau de Saclay (12)	3–0	SFC Bailly Noisy-le-Roi (9)
57.	Champcueil FC (13)	0–3	US Châtelet-en-Brie (11)
58.	CA Paris 14 (9)	2–1	CSM Rosny-sur-Seine (10)
59.	US Lagny Messagers (11)	3–0	AS Bondy (10)
60.	FC Rambouillet Yvelines (10)	0–1	AJ Antony (11)
61.	Thiais FC (10)	2–1	Paris SC (9)
62.	ASL Janville Lardy (11)	0–3	FC Boissy (10)
63.	FC Andrésy (12)	1–3	CS Villetaneuse (10)
64.	CS Cellois (13)	3–1	FC Trois Vallées (12)
65.	OC Gif Section Foot (10)	3–2	US Mauloise (10)
66.	JS Bondy (11)	3–0	ASM Ferté-sous-Jouarre (11)
67.	US Croissy (11)	0–3	US Ris-Orangis (10)
68.	FCO Vigneux (10)	1–0	FC Servon (10)
69.	Neuilly-Plaisance FC (11)	0–4	CO Othis (10)
70.	FC Saint-Germain-Saintry-Saint-Pierre (11)	9–0	Viking Club de Paris (11)
71.	SO Rosny-sous-Bois (12)	6–1	AS Breuilloise (11)
72.	AJ Étampoise (11)	6–1	Gatinais Val de Loing FC (10)
73.	ES Paris XIII (11)	1–0	Sartrouville FC (9)
74.	Marolles FC (11)	0–3	AS Val de l'Yerres (12)
75.	ES Villabé (11)	4–1	FC Varennes 77 (12)
76.	AS Soisy-sur-Seine (10)	6–0	RC Paris 10 (11)
77.	FS Esbly (11)	1–0	JA Paris (11)
78.	Maisons-Laffitte FC (12)	2–2 (4–5 p)	CSM Île-Saint-Denis (12)
79.	USM Les Clayes-sous-Bois (11)	0–3	Mimosa Mada-Sport (12)
80.	USL Presles (11)	3–0	AF Paris 18 (11)
81.	ASS Noiséenne (10)	6–1	AAS Fresnes (10)
82.	Ablis FC Sud 78 (13)	0–7	Sèvres FC 92 (10)
83.	AS Arnouville (11)	1–1 (4–5 p)	AS Drancy Espoir (12)
84.	FC Saint-Arnoult (13)	0–3	Saint-Michel FC 91 (11)
85.	FC Chaville (10)	3–3 (5–4 p)	Villepreux FC (11)
86.	AS Victory (11)	0–3	OC Ivry (12)
87.	Antony Football Evolution (13)	3–0	CS Valenton (11)
88.	Championnet Sports Paris (10)	0–3	FC Le Chesnay 78 (9)
89.	AS Ballainvilliers (10)	2–6	FO Plaisirois (10)
90.	FC Région Houdanaise (10)	1–0	Nicolaïte Chaillot Paris (9)
91.	Santeny SL (12)	1–5	US Jouy-en-Josas (11)
92.	AFC Saint-Cyr (13)	0–3	Stade de Vanves (10)
93.	Villeneuve AFC (12)	1–9	Morsang-sur-Orge FC (10)
94.	Olympique Paris 15 (11)	0–3	ASC Velizy (10)
95.	Fontenay-en-Parisis FC (11)	3–0	CS Ternes Paris-Ouest (12)
96.	Vinsky FC (13)	0–4	FC Auvers-Ennery (10)
97.	SFC Champagne 95 (10)	3–0 (Note: Tie reversed from original draw.)	ES Vauxoise (12)
98.	CSM Eaubonne (12)	0–6	US Carrières-sur-Seine (11)
99.	Entente Méry-Mériel Bessancourt (10)	3–0	ESC Paris 20 (10)
100.	FC Bois-le-Roi (11)	3–0	CS Braytois (12)
101.	CS Mennecy (10)	2–0	Olympique Loing (10)
102.	UA Chantiers Paris (11)	0–3	UMS Pontault-Combault (9)
103.	CSM Clamart Foot (10)	0–2	ES Guyancourt Saint-Quentin-en-Yvelines (10)
104.	ES Saint-Pathus-Oissery (11)	0–1	UF Clichois (9)
105.	SC Luth (11)	0–3	US Le Pecq (10)
106.	Montmagny SF (11)	0–3	Goellycompans FC (10)
107.	Juvisy AF Essonne (13)	5–2	Vaux-le-Pénil La Rochette FC (10)
108.	AS Cheminots Ouest (12)	3–0	Triel AC (12)
109.	AS Issou (12)	1–6	AS Menucourt (10)
110.	FC Deuil-Enghien (10)	3–0	US Speals (13)
111.	FC Boissy-sous-Saint-Yon (13)	3–0	AS Grenelle (12)
112.	US Paris XIème (12)	3–0	AS Fontenay-Trésigny (11)
113.	Noyers FC (none)	0–3	FC Chevry Cossigny 77 (11)
114.	Voisins FC (9)	3–1	Breuillet FC (10)
115.	Coulommiers Brie (12)	3–0	Aresport Stains 93 (none)
116.	COSM Arcueil (10)	1–3	SC Dugny (10)
117.	FC Lissois (10)	0–5	Portugais Pontault-Combault (9)
118.	US Quincy-Voisins FC (9)	3–0	Élan Chevilly-Larue (10)
119.	FC Bonnières-sur-Seine Freneuse (12)	0–3	US Ville d'Avray (9)
120.	FC Villennes-Orgeval (11)	3–0	Paris Alésia FC (10)
121.	Milly Gâtinais FC (12)	0–1	Paris Université Club (9)
122.	US Saclas-Méréville (12)	3–0	Entente Bagneaux Nemours Saint-Pierre (10)
123.	AFL Gazeran (13)	1–3	Dourdan Sport (9)
124.	ES Caudacienne (12)	3–0	Entraide Franco Egéenne (11)
125.	AS Versailles Jussieu (13)	0–3	Lisses Foot 91 (13)
126.	FC Brunoy (9)	3–1	RCP Fontainebleau (9)
127.	AS Mesnil-le-Roi (12)	0–3	JS Pontoisienne (12)
128.	Stade Vernolitain (none)	3–0	AS Beauchamp (12)
129.	ESM Thillay-Vaudherland (11)	9–0	FC La Plaine de France (11)
130.	ES Saint-Prix (10)	3–0 (Note: The match was originally played on 29 August 2021, ending in a 3–0 victory for ES Saint-Prix. However, the referee had allowed a fourth substitution to be made by the home side, and the league ordered the match to be replayed on 5 September. AS Saint-Mard forfeited the replay.)	AS Saint-Mard (11)
131.	Olympique Viarmes Asnières-sur-Oise (11)	3–0	USM Gagny (10)
132.	FC Boussy-Quincy (10)	1–0	AS Bois d'Arcy (9)
133.	EFC Ecquevilly (12)	0–3	Goutte d'Or FC (12)
134.	Saint-Thibault-des-Vignes FC (10)	2–2 (5–3 p)	Stade de l'Est Pavillonnais (9)
135.	CO Cachan (9)	1–0	SO Houilles (10)
136.	ES Brie Nord (11)	1–1 (6–5 p)	Flamboyants Villepinte (9)
137.	FC Maurecourt (13)	3–0	USM Bruyères-Bernes (12)
138.	UF Créteil (10)	2–0	AS Lieusaint (10)
139.	AS Guerville-Arnouville (12)	1–5	Argenteuil FC (9)
140.	US Montsoult-Baillet-Maffliers (12)	1–1 (3–4 p)	FC Saint-Germain-en-Laye (11)
141.	Montreuil Souvenir 93 (11)	3–0	FC Brie Est (12)
142.	AS Fontenay-Saint-Père (12)	– (Note: Match not played, due to the pitch not being marked out properly at kick-off. AS Fontenay-Saint-Père penalised. JA Montrouge qualify.)	JA Montrouge (12)
143.	USD Ferrières-en-Brie (11)	0–3	SC Épinay-sur-Orge (10)
144.	Aubergenville FC (9)	1–0	FC Groslay (9)
145.	ES Petit Anges Paris (11)	0–15	AS Bucheloise (9)
146.	CS Dammartin (12)	4–2	JS Paris (12)
147.	US Chanteloup-les-Vignes (10)	2–3	US Persan (9)
148.	USM Audonienne (none)	0–3	AS Carrières Grésillons (9)
149.	Bussy Saint-Georges FC (11)	1–3	RC Gonesse (10)
150.	Aigle Fertoise Boissy le Cutté (11)	3–0	Héricy-Vulaines-Samoreau FC (11)
151.	AS Éragny FC (10)	2–0	Ménilmontant FC 1871 (11)
152.	Savigny-le-Temple FC (10)	1–0	ES Montreuil (10)
153.	US Yvelines (13)	2–3	FC Wissous (9)
154.	ASM Chambourcy (11)	6–0	FC Montmorency (11)
155.	AC Orly (none)	0–3	Saint-Cloud FC (9)
156.	US Villeneuve Ablon (10)	– (Note: EFC Bobigny penalised, reason currently unknown. US Villeneuve Ablon qualify.)	EFC Bobigny (11)
157.	RC Arpajonnais (10)	5–1	ES Pays de Bière (11)
158.	FC Gournay (12)	3–0	CA Lizéen (11)
159.	AS Le Pin-Villevaude (10)	0–6	FC Écouen (9)
160.	Magny-en-Vexin FC (12)	0–4	USBS Épône (9)
161.	Courtry Foot (11)	0–3	Entente Beaumont Mours (12)
162.	CS Achères (13)	3–0	AS La Plaine Victoire (12)
163.	US Vert-le-Grand (12)	1–3	ASA Montereau (9)
164.	SCM Châtillonnais (10)	2–1	Champs FC (11)
165.	FC Coudraysien (13)	3–0	Amicale Bocage (12)
166.	ASC Réunionnais de Sénart (12)	0–4	FC Longjumeau (10)
167.	BO Attitude (13)	0–3	Paris IFA (10)
168.	Marcoussis Nozay La-Ville-du-Bois FC (10)	5–2	USC Lésigny (10)
169.	Benfica Argoselo Sports Paris (12)	2–15	AS Montigny-le-Bretonneux (10)
170.	FC Moret-Veneux Sablons (10)	1–5	FC Orsay-Bures (9)
171.	OFC Couronnes (9)	1–0 (2–4 p) (Note: FC Émerainville penalised, reason currently unknown. OFC Couronnes qualify.)	FC Émerainville (10)
172.	FC Villiers-le-Bel (10)	0–0 (4–3 p)	AS Champs-sur-Marne (10)
173.	FC Dammarie-lès-Lys (12)	2–2 (3–4 p)	CSM Bonneuil-sur-Marne (9)
174.	Atletico Bagnolet (12)	0–3	US Ponthierry (10)
175.	FC Fontenay-le-Fleury (12)	0–4	Olympique Neuilly (9)
176.	Stade Français (13)	1–0	AFC Mantes Yvelines (13)
177.	FC Domont (10)	0–3	AS Chelles (9)
178.	Bougival Foot (12)	2–2 (4–5 p)	CA Romainville (12)
179.	FC Vallée 78 (9)	5–1	JSC Pitray-Olier (10)
180.	AS Ultra Marine Vitry (10)	1–3	FC Bourget (9)

=== Second round ===
These matches were played on 5 September 2021, with one postponed until 12 September 2021 due to the first round replay.

Second round results: Paris-Île-de-France
Tie no	Home team (tier)	Score	Away team (tier)
1.	ESM Thillay-Vaudherland (11)	1–5	FC Solitaires Paris Est (9)
2.	FC Auvers-Ennery (10)	1–1 (3–5 p)	FO Plaisirois (10)
3.	Magny FC 78 (12)	1–12	RC Arpajonnais (10)
4.	ES Montgeron (11)	0–3 (Note: Tie won by means of forfeit.)	COM Bagneux (8)
5.	USBS Épône (9)	0–1	CSM Puteaux (8)
6.	CA Romainville (12)	1–4	Pays Créçois FC (9)
7.	US Le Pecq (10)	1–1 (2–3 p)	FC Orsay-Bures (9)
8.	FC Saint-Germain-en-Laye (11)	11–0	Mimosa Mada-Sport (12)
9.	Aigle Fertoise Boissy le Cutté (11)	0–1	CA Paris-Charenton (8)
10.	FC Villennes-Orgeval (11)	0–2	Salésienne de Paris (9)
11.	FC Longjumeau (10)	1–2	CO Cachan (9)
12.	Morsang-sur-Orge FC (10)	2–0	FC Romainville (10)
13.	AS Choisy-le-Roi (7)	3–1	FC Étampes (8)
14.	Olympique Neuilly (9)	– (Note: Match abandoned after an altercation. Both teams penalised, neither qualify.)	OSC Élancourt (10)
15.	FC Deuil-Enghien (10)	1–1 (3–2 p)	FC Bourget (9)
16.	FC Coudraysien (13)	2–2 (10–11 p)	Stade de Vanves (10)
17.	Soisy-Andilly-Margency FC (9)	2–3	ASS Noiséenne (10)
18.	USF Trilport (10)	2–2 (4–3 p)	ES Stains (8)
19.	Olympique Mantes (13)	0–2	AS Éragny FC (10)
20.	Juvisy AF Essonne (13)	2–8	US Hardricourt (8)
21.	Entente Beaumont Mours (12)	0–3	SO Rosny-sous-Bois (12)
22.	USA Clichy (10)	1–6	Olympique Adamois (7)
23.	AS Ermont (8)	1–2	Montreuil FC (7)
24.	SC Épinay-sur-Orge (10)	7–2	FC Bois-le-Roi (11)
25.	FC Boissy (10)	2–2 (4–2 p)	SS Voltaire Châtenay-Malabry (10)
26.	Coulommiers Brie (12)	0–14	US Villejuif (7)
27.	FC Boissy-sous-Saint-Yon (13)	1–3	AS Maurepas (8)
28.	Entente Méry-Mériel Bessancourt (10)	1–5	Saint-Denis US (6)
29.	Cosmos Saint-Denis FC (10)	2–2 (4–5 p)	US Persan (9)
30.	FC Wissous (9)	0–10	CA Vitry (6)
31.	FC Chaville (10)	1–1 (4–5 p)	FCO Vigneux (10)
32.	Draveil FC (10)	1–1 (2–4 p)	Thiais FC (10)
33.	CS Villetaneuse (10)	2–6	AF Garenne-Colombes (6)
34.	SFC Bailly Noisy-le-Roi (9)	1–4	AS Saint-Ouen-l'Aumône (6)
35.	FC Herblay-sur-Seine (9)	1–1 (5–6 p)	Neauphle-le-Château-Pontchartrain RC 78 (7)
36.	UF Clichois (9)	0–0 (2–4 p)	US Vaires-sur-Marne (8)
37.	CO Othis (10)	1–4	FC Livry-Gargan (7)
38.	AS Bucheloise (9)	0–6	Courbevoie Sports (7)
39.	Stade Vernolitain (none)	0–3	FC Courcouronnes (7)
40.	Amicale Villeneuve-la-Garenne (9)	2–4	CO Vincennes (6)
41.	FC Goussainville (8)	1–2	Claye-Souilly SF (6)
42.	OC Ivry (12)	0–8	Portugais Pontault-Combault (9)
43.	US Châtelet-en-Brie (11)	0–11	FC Morangis-Chilly (7)
44.	FC Villepinte (10)	3–0	AS Outre-Mer du Bois l'Abbé (11)
45.	FC Porcheville (13)	0–7	AS Courdimanche (11)
46.	Lisses Foot 91 (13)	0–7	ES Trappes (7)
47.	AS Menucourt (10)	6–0	ALJ Limay (8)
48.	FC Maisons Alfort (8)	2–3	AC Paris 15 (7)
49.	ASF Le Perreux (9)	0–0 (4–3 p)	CSL Aulnay (8)
50.	Saint-Maur VGA (8)	3–0	Meaux ADOM (7)
51.	Neuilly-Plaisance Sports (11)	4–2	Olympique Viarmes Asnières-sur-Oise (11)
52.	FC Région Houdanaise (10)	0–1	OC Gif Section Foot (10)
53.	La Camillienne Sports 12ème (9)	1–0	USM Villeparisis (8)
54.	AS Montigny-le-Bretonneux (10)	7–2	USM Malakoff (11)
55.	Entente Pays du Limours (12)	0–1	FC Vallée 78 (9)
56.	Montreuil Souvenir 93 (11)	1–14	SC Gretz-Tournan (8)
57.	Grigny FC (12)	1–5	Goutte d'Or FC (12)
58.	US Ville d'Avray (9)	2–3	Évry FC (8)
59.	FC Nogent-sur-Marne (10)	0–3	Mitry-Mory (7)
60.	FC Villiers-le-Bel (10)	2–4	OFC Pantin (8)
61.	Gargenville Stade (9)	0–5	Osny FC (8)
62.	Saint-Cloud FC (9)	2–0	FC Boussy-Quincy (10)
63.	Aubergenville FC (9)	1–1 (4–5 p)	FC Massy 91 (8)
64.	Paris Université Club (9)	4–4 (5–3 p)	AAS Sarcelles (7)
65.	AS Val de l'Yerres (12)	0–3	Noisy-le-Grand FC (6)
66.	Fontenay-en-Parisis FC (11)	2–2 (2–4 p)	FA Le Raincy (10)
67.	US Carrières-sur-Seine (11)	1–2	ES Seizième (8)
68.	ES Guyancourt Saint-Quentin-en-Yvelines (10)	0–3	FC Issy-les-Moulineaux (7)
69.	US Jouy-en-Josas (11)	9–1 (Note: Tie reversed from original draw.)	FC Villiers-sur-Orge (13)
70.	Sèvres FC 92 (10)	2–3	Paray FC (8)
71.	AS Drancy Espoir (12)	4–2	ES Brie Nord (11)
72.	CSM Bonneuil-sur-Marne (9)	0–3	FC Rueil Malmaison (8)
73.	AO Buc Foot (12)	0–1	FC Épinay Athletico (11)
74.	FC Maurecourt (13)	1–4	Stade Français (13)
75.	FS Esbly (11)	0–3	FCM Garges-lès-Gonesse (8)
76.	FC Jouy-le-Moutier (10)	2–3	ASM Chambourcy (11)
77.	Paris IFA (10)	0–1	CA Combs-la-Ville (9)
78.	FC Mormant (11)	0–4	FC Saint-Germain-Saintry-Saint-Pierre (11)
79.	FC Portugais Plessis Placy (11)	2–10	Savigny-le-Temple FC (10)
80.	Goellycompans FC (10)	2–1	ES Paris XIII (11)
81.	ASA Montereau (9)	3–9	CO Savigny (9)
82.	AJ Antony (11)	2–0	AJ Étampoise (11)
83.	FC Plateau Bréval Longnes (13)	1–0	AS Cheminots Ouest (12)
84.	JS Pontoisienne (12)	0–3	Épinay Académie (8)
85.	FC Portugais US Ris-Orangis (11)	1–5	US Rungis (7)
86.	AS Nanteuil-lès-Meaux (10)	0–3	FC Franconville (7)
87.	CS Cellois (13)	3–1	CS Pouchet Paris XVII (11)
88.	FC Chevry Cossigny 77 (11)	0–5	US Paris XIème (12)
89.	ES Parisienne (7)	2–0	USO Bezons (10)
90.	USL Presles (11)	0–8	ES Nanterre (7)
91.	UMS Pontault-Combault (9)	2–0	ES Marly-la-Ville (8)
92.	Saint-Michel FC 91 (11)	2–1	ASA Issy (7)
93.	FC Coubronnais (11)	2–1	Cosmo Taverny (7)
94.	FC Asnières (11)	3–3 (3–5 p)	SFC Champagne 95 (10)
95.	US Marly-le-Roi (8)	2–0	Espérance Paris 19ème (9)
96.	FC Cosmo 77 (11)	4–0	UF Créteil (10)
97.	FC Le Chesnay 78 (9)	1–2	FC Saint-Leu (6)
98.	CSM Gennevilliers (7)	0–1	US Palaiseau (8)
99.	CS Dammartin (12)	1–7	UJA Maccabi Paris Métropole (8)
100.	AS Carrières Grésillons (9)	1–3	RFC Argenteuil (8)
101.	Saint-Thibault-des-Vignes FC (10)	1–7	Saint-Brice FC (6)
102.	ES Cesson Vert Saint-Denis (7)	3–5	Montrouge FC 92 (6)
103.	Argenteuil FC (9)	1–1 (1–3 p)	Espérance Aulnay (6)
104.	JA Montrouge (12)	1–8	Val Yerres Crosne AF (7)
105.	Magny-le-Hongre FC (11)	1–5	Olympique Noisy-le-Sec (6)
106.	Dourdan Sport (9)	1–2	US Sénart-Moissy (6)
107.	FC Saint Vrain (11)	0–6	FC Melun (7)
108.	US Changis-Saint-Jean-Ussy (10)	1–7	Villemomble Sports (6)
109.	CS Achères (13)	0–10	Cergy-Pontoise FC (6)
110.	Tremplin Foot (8)	0–3	Sucy FC (6)
111.	AS Sud Essonne (10)	1–4	Champigny FC 94 (7)
112.	AS Chatou (6)	11–0	CSM Île-Saint-Denis (12)
113.	Val d'Europe FC (7)	0–1	FC Les Lilas (6)
114.	Voisins FC (9)	1–0	US Grigny (7)
115.	FC Gournay (12)	1–4	FC Ozoir-la-Ferrière 77 (7)
116.	Antony Football Evolution (13)	0–10	AC Houilles (7)
117.	US Ris-Orangis (10)	3–3 (2–4 p)	US Alfortville (7)
118.	FCM Vauréal (10)	0–2	Conflans FC (6)
119.	ASC Velizy (10)	1–4	ES Colombienne (6)
120.	FC Puiseux-Louvres (11)	1–3	US Quincy-Voisins FC (9)
121.	FC Écouen (9)	1–4	FC Montfermeil (7)
122.	ES Caudacienne (12)	2–2 (2–3 p)	ES Villabé (11)
123.	US Lagny Messagers (11)	0–3	SCM Châtillonnais (10)
124.	SC Dugny (10)	0–7	US Torcy (6)
125.	US Boissise-Pringy-Orgenoy (10)	0–1	FC Igny (7)
126.	AS Chelles (9)	0–0 (5–4 p)	ASC La Courneuve (8)
127.	FC Bry (11)	0–4	Val de France Foot (8)
128.	CS Mennecy (10)	0–3	Athletic Club de Boulogne-Billancourt (6)
129.	AS Angervilliers (12)	0–5	Le Mée Sports (6)
130.	Guyane FC Paris (11)	0–6	US Villeneuve Ablon (10)
131.	RC Gonesse (10)	5–1	OFC Couronnes (9)
132.	US Saclas-Méréville (12)	2–3	US Ponthierry (10)
133.	CA Paris 14 (9)	2–3	US Fontenay-sous-Bois (7)
134.	FC Brunoy (9)	1–5	FC Plessis-Robinson (6)
135.	Enfants de Passy Paris (11)	3–0	JS Bondy (11)
136.	AS Fontenaisienne (13)	2–6	Marcoussis Nozay La-Ville-du-Bois FC (10)
137.	AJSC Nanterre (10)	3–3 (2–4 p)	US Verneuil-sur-Seine (10)
138.	Enfants de la Goutte d'Or (10)	1–3	SFC Neuilly-sur-Marne (7)
139.	AS Soisy-sur-Seine (10)	2–10	JS Suresnes (7)
140.	ES Vitry (9)	0–4	ES Viry-Châtillon (6)
141.	ES Villiers-sur-Marne (10)	1–3	ES Saint-Prix (10)

=== Third round ===
These matches were played on 18 and 19 September 2021.

Third round results: Paris-Île-de-France
Tie no	Home team (tier)	Score	Away team (tier)
1.	Stade de Vanves (10)	1–1 (3–4 p)	Olympique Noisy-le-Sec (6)
2.	FC Ozoir-la-Ferrière 77 (7)	1–1 (2–3 p)	Blanc-Mesnil SF (5)
3.	RC Gonesse (10)	3–3 (5–3 p)	Villemomble Sports (6)
4.	US Verneuil-sur-Seine (10)	2–4	US Palaiseau (8)
5.	FC Saint-Germain-Saintry-Saint-Pierre (11)	3–5	US Ivry (5)
6.	CS Cellois (13)	0–3	ES Colombienne (6)
7.	ES Saint-Prix (10)	2–4	ES Parisienne (7)
8.	Saint-Brice FC (6)	0–0 (2–3 p)	Mitry-Mory (7)
9.	ES Villabé (11)	2–1	AJ Antony (11)
10.	AS Éragny FC (10)	1–3	FC Les Lilas (6)
11.	FA Le Raincy (10)	1–2	Paris Université Club (9)
12.	FC Franconville (7)	2–0	Val de France Foot (8)
13.	US Ponthierry (10)	1–1 (5–4 p)	ASF Le Perreux (9)
14.	SFC Champagne 95 (10)	2–1	FC Mantois 78 (5)
15.	FO Plaisirois (10)	4–4 (4–2 p)	Saint-Cloud FC (9)
16.	CA Combs-la-Ville (9)	0–4	CSM Puteaux (8)
17.	Courbevoie Sports (7)	4–2	US Marly-le-Roi (8)
18.	Épinay Académie (8)	1–2	Salésienne de Paris (9)
19.	FC Coubronnais (11)	3–5	UJA Maccabi Paris Métropole (8)
20.	SC Épinay-sur-Orge (10)	2–6	AS Chatou (6)
21.	Le Mée Sports (6)	4–4 (3–2 p)	FC Livry-Gargan (7)
22.	Neauphle-le-Château-Pontchartrain RC 78 (7)	2–2 (7–8 p)	Espérance Aulnay (6)
23.	Paray FC (8)	0–2	CO Vincennes (6)
24.	FC Massy 91 (8)	1–3	OFC Les Mureaux (5)
25.	FC Boissy (10)	1–4	CS Brétigny (5)
26.	AF Garenne-Colombes (6)	1–1 (4–5 p)	Montreuil FC (7)
27.	ES Viry-Châtillon (6)	1–2	ES Nanterre (7)
28.	RFC Argenteuil (8)	1–1 (5–4 p)	FC Plessis-Robinson (6)
29.	FC Morangis-Chilly (7)	1–1 (2–3 p)	US Torcy (6)
30.	US Rungis (7)	0–0 (1–4 p)	JA Drancy (5)
31.	OFC Pantin (8)	1–1 (3–5 p)	Claye-Souilly SF (6)
32.	Val Yerres Crosne AF (7)	4–1	CA Vitry (6)
33.	FC Saint-Leu (6)	0–2	ES Trappes (7)
34.	FCM Garges-lès-Gonesse (8)	0–5	Conflans FC (6)
35.	Neuilly-Plaisance Sports (11)	2–6	US Fontenay-sous-Bois (7)
36.	Osny FC (8)	0–4	FC Montfermeil (7)
37.	US Jouy-en-Josas (11)	2–7	JS Suresnes (7)
38.	AS Montigny-le-Bretonneux (10)	0–7	Cergy-Pontoise FC (6)
39.	ASM Chambourcy (11)	2–2 (4–2 p)	FC Villepinte (10)
40.	FC Épinay Athletico (11)	2–1	Goutte d'Or FC (12)
41.	FC Saint-Germain-en-Laye (11)	0–4	Athletic Club de Boulogne-Billancourt (6)
42.	Pays Créçois FC (9)	0–5	AC Paris 15 (7)
43.	US Quincy-Voisins FC (9)	4–0 (Note: Tie reversed from original draw.)	AS Drancy Espoir (12)
44.	FC Vallée 78 (9)	0–3	CA Paris-Charenton (8)
45.	Portugais Pontault-Combault (9)	1–0	Thiais FC (10)
46.	FC Cosmo 77 (11)	0–2	Saint-Maur VGA (8)
47.	FCO Vigneux (10)	0–4	US Villejuif (7)
48.	SO Rosny-sous-Bois (12)	1–9	CS Meaux (5)
49.	SC Gretz-Tournan (8)	1–1 (5–3 p)	Montrouge FC 92 (6)
50.	US Hardricourt (8)	0–0 (4–2 p)	AS Saint-Ouen-l'Aumône (6)
51.	AS Courdimanche (11)	7–3	Enfants de Passy Paris (11)
52.	FC Rueil Malmaison (8)	1–2	CO Les Ulis (5)
53.	AS Menucourt (10)	2–5	Champigny FC 94 (7)
54.	Noisy-le-Grand FC (6)	4–1	FC Courcouronnes (7)
55.	US Vaires-sur-Marne (8)	1–2	ESA Linas-Montlhéry (5)
56.	OC Gif Section Foot (10)	2–2 (4–3 p)	FC Melun (7)
57.	FC Solitaires Paris Est (9)	0–4	FCM Aubervilliers (5)
58.	Morsang-sur-Orge FC (10)	0–3	SFC Neuilly-sur-Marne (7)
59.	AS Maurepas (8)	1–2	US Sénart-Moissy (6)
60.	CO Cachan (9)	2–1	Goellycompans FC (10)
61.	US Persan (9)	0–4	FC Issy-les-Moulineaux (7)
62.	Évry FC (8)	1–1 (4–1 p)	UMS Pontault-Combault (9)
63.	Stade Français (13)	1–3	FC Plateau Bréval Longnes (13)
64.	Saint-Michel FC 91 (11)	1–1 (4–2 p)	AS Choisy-le-Roi (7)
65.	SCM Châtillonnais (10)	4–1	La Camillienne Sports 12ème (9)
66.	Voisins FC (9)	1–1 (4–1 p)	FC Igny (7)
67.	US Villeneuve Ablon (10)	2–1	USF Trilport (10)
68.	AS Chelles (9)	2–0	Sucy FC (6)
69.	FC Orsay-Bures (9)	0–1	Racing Club de France Football (5)
70.	ASS Noiséenne (10)	0–3	AC Houilles (7)
71.	COM Bagneux (8)	2–2 (5–6 p)	Saint-Denis US (6)
72.	US Paris XIème (12)	0–12	Marcoussis Nozay La-Ville-du-Bois FC (10)
73.	CO Savigny (9)	3–1	US Alfortville (7)
74.	Savigny-le-Temple FC (10)	1–0	RC Arpajonnais (10)
75.	ES Seizième (8)	1–2	Olympique Adamois (7)

=== Fourth round ===
These matches were played on 2 and 3 October 2021, with one postponed until 10 October 2021.

Fourth round results: Paris-Île-de-France
Tie no	Home team (tier)	Score	Away team (tier)
1.	Claye-Souilly SF (6)	1–3	US Sénart-Moissy (6)
2.	US Ivry (5)	2–1	JA Drancy (5)
3.	US Fontenay-sous-Bois (7)	1–1 (4–3 p)	Champigny FC 94 (7)
4.	Mitry-Mory (7)	0–2	Entente SSG (4)
5.	FC Plateau Bréval Longnes (13)	0–2	CO Vincennes (6)
6.	Espérance Aulnay (6)	4–3	FC Issy-les-Moulineaux (7)
7.	CA Paris-Charenton (8)	2–0	CSM Puteaux (8)
8.	SFC Neuilly-sur-Marne (7)	2–0	Noisy-le-Grand FC (6)
9.	SC Gretz-Tournan (8)	0–0 (3–4 p)	AS Poissy (4)
10.	CO Les Ulis (5)	0–1	Le Mée Sports (6)
11.	FC Épinay Athletico (11)	0–3	ES Colombienne (6)
12.	RFC Argenteuil (8)	2–0	Olympique Noisy-le-Sec (6)
13.	Savigny-le-Temple FC (10)	1–2	Cergy-Pontoise FC (6)
14.	ES Nanterre (7)	2–0	US Palaiseau (8)
15.	Saint-Maur VGA (8)	0–2	Val Yerres Crosne AF (7)
16.	AC Paris 15 (7)	0–0 (4–3 p)	CS Meaux (5)
17.	SFC Champagne 95 (10)	0–0 (2–4 p)	US Hardricourt (8)
18.	CO Savigny (9)	1–1 (5–4 p)	FC Montfermeil (7)
19.	SCM Châtillonnais (10)	0–1	Olympique Adamois (7)
20.	RC Gonesse (10)	2–3	FC Les Lilas (6)
21.	Voisins FC (9)	1–2	Courbevoie Sports (7)
22.	FC Versailles 78 (4)	3–0	CS Brétigny (5)
23.	FC Deuil-Enghien (10)	3–0	ES Parisienne (7)
24.	JS Suresnes (7)	1–1 (4–3 p)	Paris 13 Atletico (4)
25.	Saint-Michel FC 91 (11)	1–0	AC Houilles (7)
26.	AS Chelles (9)	0–1	Sainte-Geneviève Sports (4)
27.	ASM Chambourcy (11)	2–2 (4–3 p)	US Villeneuve Ablon (10)
28.	ES Villabé (11)	2–4	Évry FC (8)
29.	FO Plaisirois (10)	1–1 (11–12 p)	Racing Club de France Football (5)
30.	OFC Les Mureaux (5)	0–1	FC Fleury 91 (4)
31.	Portugais Pontault-Combault (9)	0–4	Conflans FC (6)
32.	Saint-Denis US (6)	2–3	Blanc-Mesnil SF (5)
33.	US Quincy-Voisins FC (9)	0–8	AS Chatou (6)
34.	Athletic Club de Boulogne-Billancourt (6)	0–2	Football Club 93 Bobigny-Bagnolet-Gagny (4)
35.	Montreuil FC (7)	1–1 (4–3 p)	FCM Aubervilliers (5)
36.	AS Courdimanche (11)	0–10	US Lusitanos Saint-Maur (4)
37.	Paris Université Club (9)	2–2 (4–5 p)	ES Trappes (7)
38.	OC Gif Section Foot (10)	1–3	UJA Maccabi Paris Métropole (8)
39.	Marcoussis Nozay La-Ville-du-Bois FC (10)	0–3	ESA Linas-Montlhéry (5)
40.	Salésienne de Paris (9)	3–1	US Ponthierry (10)
41.	CO Cachan (9)	1–1 (4–2 p)	FC Franconville (7)
42.	US Torcy (6)	1–0	US Villejuif (7)

=== Fifth round ===
These matches were played on 16 and 17 October 2021.

Fifth round results: Paris-Île-de-France
Tie no	Home team (tier)	Score	Away team (tier)
1.	Football Club 93 Bobigny-Bagnolet-Gagny (4)	3–2	US Ivry (5)
2.	FC Deuil-Enghien (10)	0–2	US Lusitanos Saint-Maur (4)
3.	AS Poissy (4)	3–0	Sainte-Geneviève Sports (4)
4.	FC Les Lilas (6)	2–1	AC Paris 15 (7)
5.	Salésienne de Paris (9)	2–1	CO Vincennes (6)
6.	CO Savigny (9)	0–1	US Sénart-Moissy (6)
7.	CA Paris-Charenton (8)	0–0 (4–5 p)	RFC Argenteuil (8)
8.	ES Colombienne (6)	0–0 (3–1 p)	Le Mée Sports (6)
9.	Saint-Michel FC 91 (11)	1–1 (4–5 p)	JS Suresnes (7)
10.	UJA Maccabi Paris Métropole (8)	1–1 (2–4 p)	Cergy-Pontoise FC (6)
11.	Conflans FC (6)	1–1 (3–4 p)	ES Nanterre (7)
12.	Évry FC (8)	1–2	FC Fleury 91 (4)
13.	ASM Chambourcy (11)	0–6	Red Star F.C. (3)
14.	Espérance Aulnay (6)	2–2 (3–2 p)	Montreuil FC (7)
15.	SFC Neuilly-sur-Marne (7)	0–0 (7–6 p)	Racing Club de France Football (5)
16.	US Créteil-Lusitanos (3)	4–0	Entente SSG (4)
17.	Olympique Adamois (7)	0–3	Blanc-Mesnil SF (5)
18.	AS Chatou (6)	4–0	US Fontenay-sous-Bois (7)
19.	ES Trappes (7)	2–2 (2–4 p) (Note: Tie reversed from original draw.)	US Torcy (6)
20.	CO Cachan (9)	0–4	FC Versailles 78 (4)
21.	Val Yerres Crosne AF (7)	0–2	ESA Linas-Montlhéry (5)
22.	Courbevoie Sports (7)	1–0	US Hardricourt (8)

=== Sixth round ===
These matches were played on 30 and 31 October 2021.

Sixth round results: Paris-Île-de-France
Tie no	Home team (tier)	Score	Away team (tier)
1.	Salésienne de Paris (9)	2–4	Espérance Aulnay (6)
2.	US Torcy (6)	2–4	AS Chatou (6)
3.	RFC Argenteuil (8)	0–2	Cergy-Pontoise FC (6)
4.	US Sénart-Moissy (6)	1–1 (5–4 p)	FC Les Lilas (6)
5.	Blanc-Mesnil SF (5)	2–3	Football Club 93 Bobigny-Bagnolet-Gagny (4)
6.	FC Fleury 91 (4)	0–2	AS Poissy (4)
7.	Courbevoie Sports (7)	0–0 (1–4 p)	US Créteil-Lusitanos (3)
8.	JS Suresnes (7)	0–0 (8–9 p)	ESA Linas-Montlhéry (5)
9.	ES Nanterre (7)	3–1	ES Colombienne (6)
10.	Red Star F.C. (3)	3–0	US Lusitanos Saint-Maur (4)
11.	SFC Neuilly-sur-Marne (7)	0–1	FC Versailles 78 (4)
