= Arassen Ragaven =

French-born Mauritian footballer (born 1987)

Personal information
- Date of birth: 8 April 1987 (age 39)
- Place of birth: Paris, France
- Height: 1.77 m (5 ft 10 in)
- Position: Midfielder

Senior career*
Years	Team	Apps	(Gls)
2004–2005	Auxerre B		
2005–2007	Lorient B		
2007–2009	Moissy-Cramayel	34	(1)
2009–2011	Melun		
2011–2012	Val Yerres Crosne AF		
2012–2013	Fontainebleau		

International career
2006–2017	Mauritius	14	(0)
- * Club domestic league appearances and goals

Arassen Ragaven (born 8 April 1987) is a former professional footballer who played as a midfielder. Born in France, he represented Mauritius internationally, earning a total of 14 caps for the national team.
