= Stade Municipal de Melun =

Stadium in Melun, France

- Stade Municipal
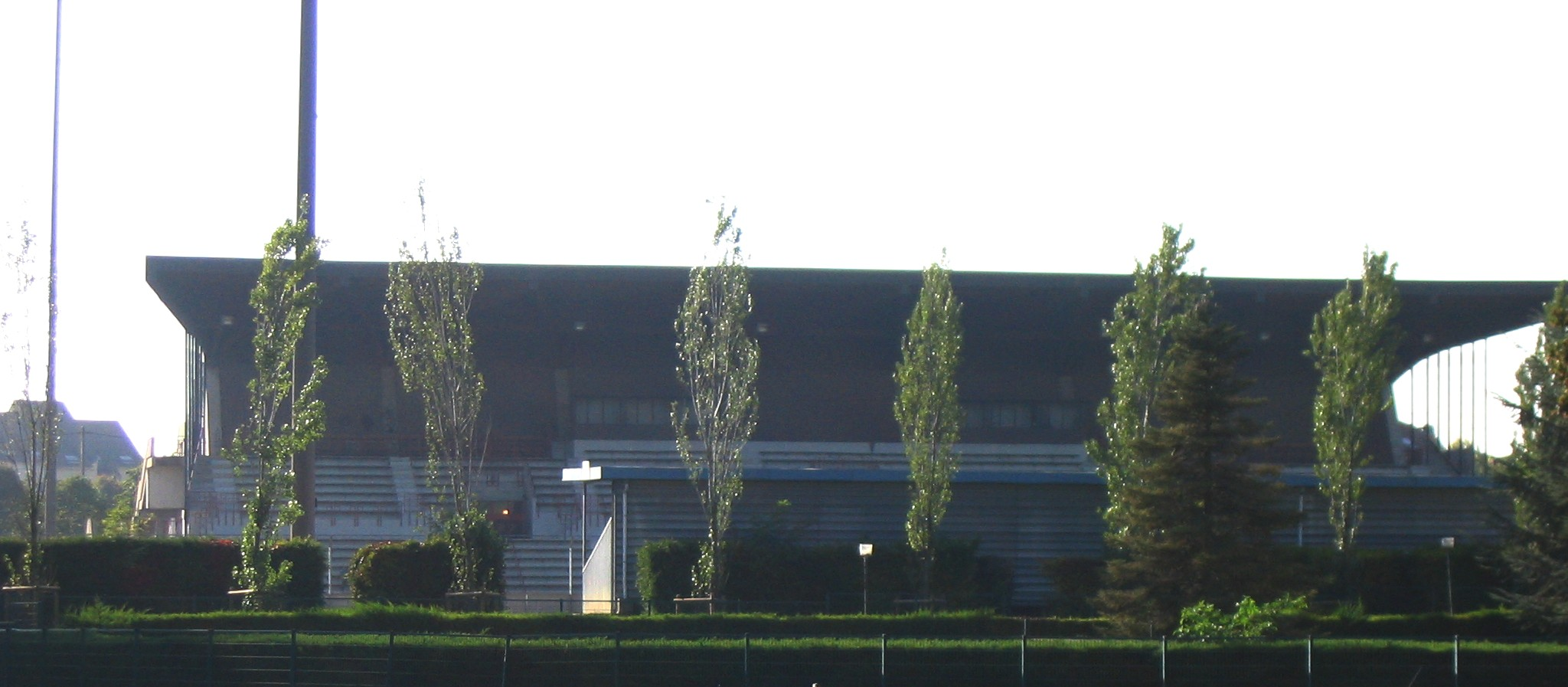
- Interactive map of Stade Municipal de Melun
- Location: Place de la Motte aux Cailles 77000 Melun, Île-de-France, France
- Coordinates: 48°31′51.6″N 2°39′51.5″E
- Owner: City of Melun
- Capacity: 6,494 (1,994 seated)
- Surface: Grass
- Field size: 105 m × 70 m (344 ft × 230 ft)

Tenants
- FC Melun; Union Sportive Melunaise

The Stade Municipal de Melun (French pronunciation: [stad mynisipal də məlœ̃]) is a multi-purpose stadium located in Melun, France. It is used for football matches, rugby union matches, and athletic competitions. The stadium is the home ground of Régional 2 club FC Melun, and is used by several sections of Union Sportive Melunaise, a multi-sport club.

The stadium has a full-size football and rugby field surrounded by a 400-meter long six-lane track and a 100-meter long eight-lane track. There are a total of 1,994 seats and 4,500 standing places. The infrastructure also has a boulodrome for playing boules.

In 2010, a fire broke out at the stadium. The main stand was significantly damaged as a result.

== Notable matches ==
=== Football ===
The Stade Municipal de Melun hosted a Coupe de France round of 64 match between Évry FC and AS Saint-Étienne in the 1992–93 season. It ended in a 3–1 win for Saint-Étienne, and 6,870 people attended the game.

The stadium has hosted several international football matches. One of those was a friendly between Angola and Ivory Coast on 17 November 2007, the final score being 2–1 in favor of Angola. It also hosted two group stage matches from the 2008 Coupe de l'Outre-Mer. One of those was a 1–0 win for Martinique over Tahiti, and the other was a 4–0 win for Guadeloupe over New Caledonia.

=== Rugby ===
In 2003, the stadium hosted two games of the Under 19 Rugby World Championship.

== Gallery ==
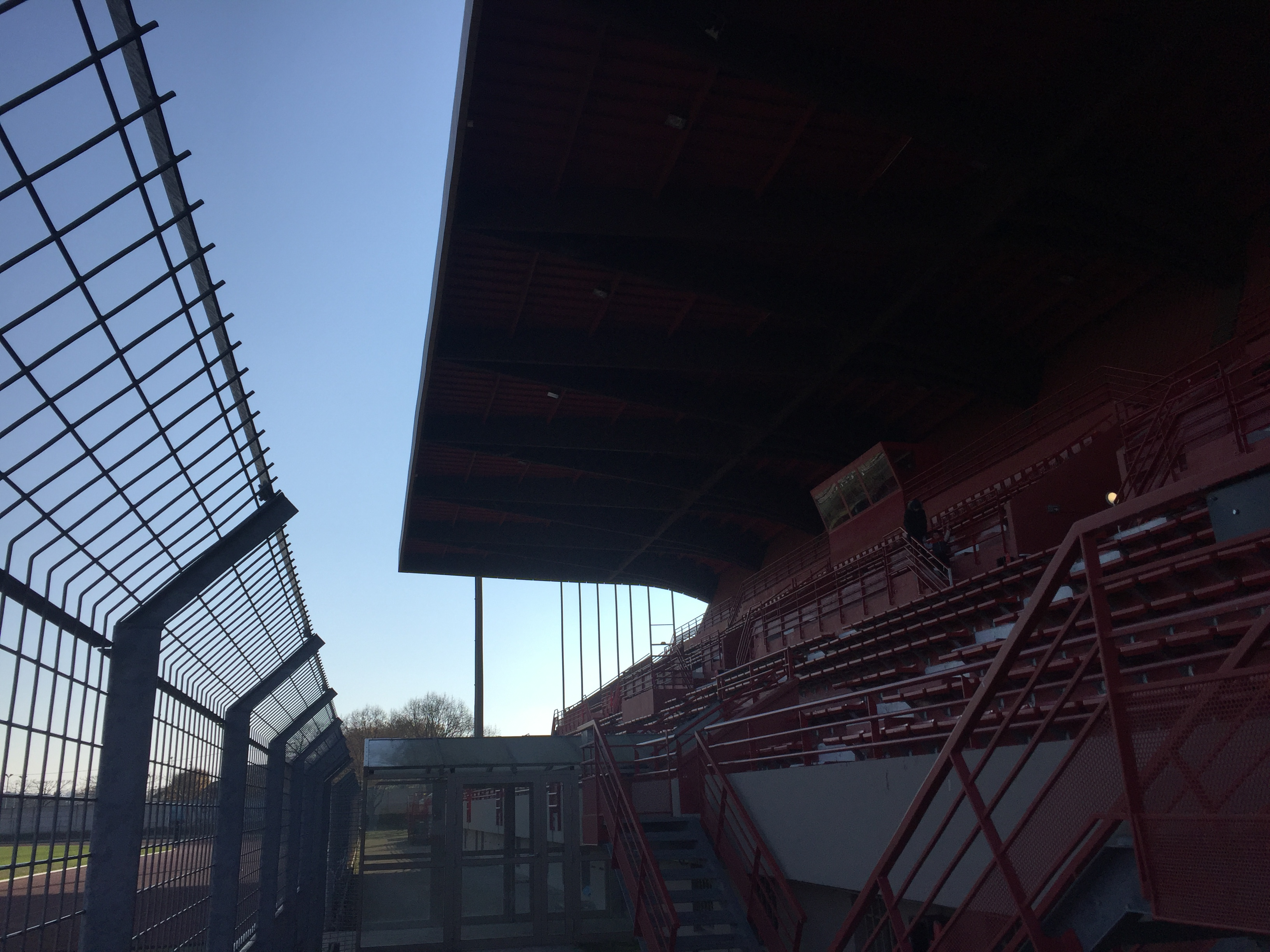
The stadium's main stand.

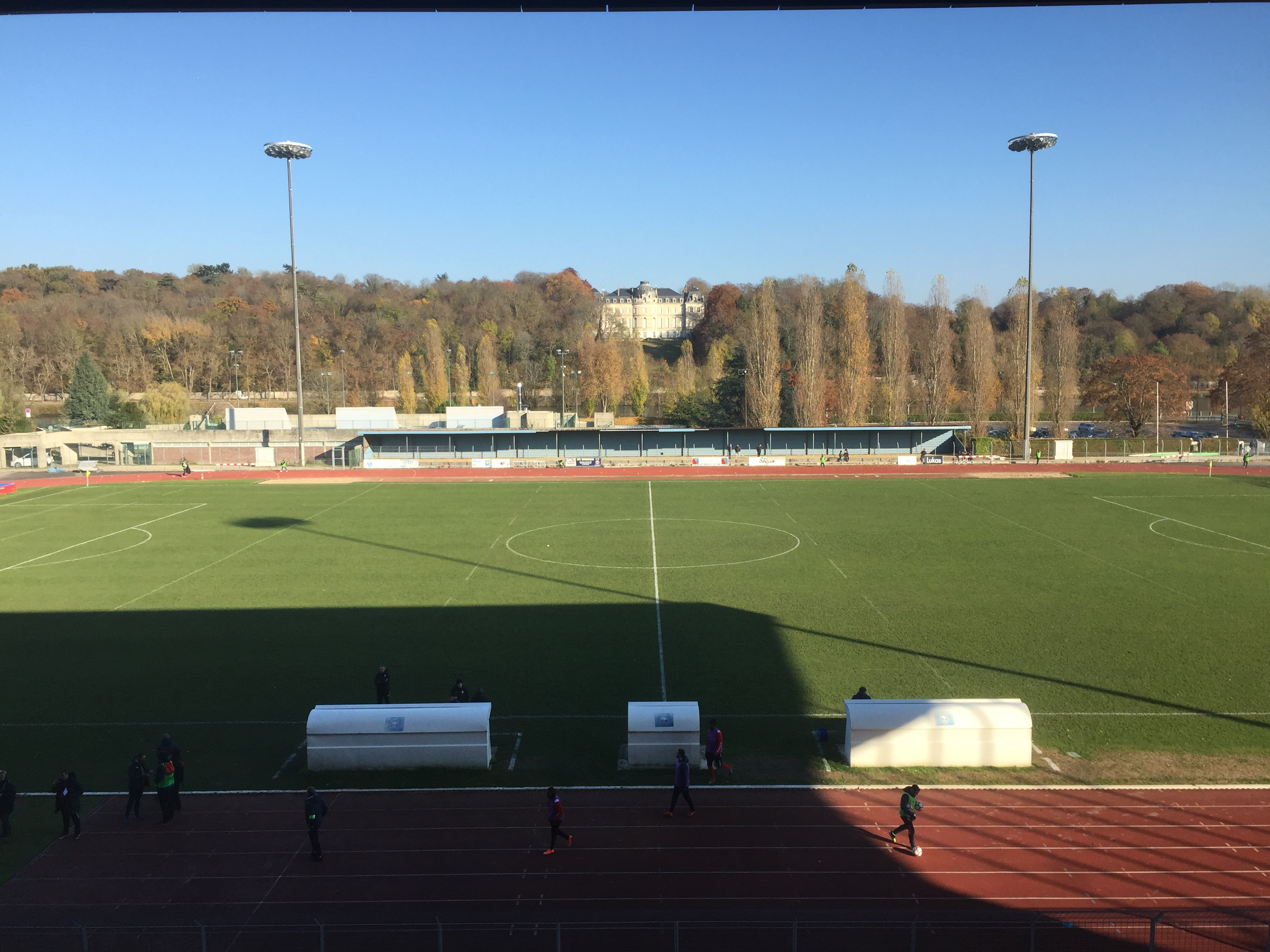
View of the pitch.

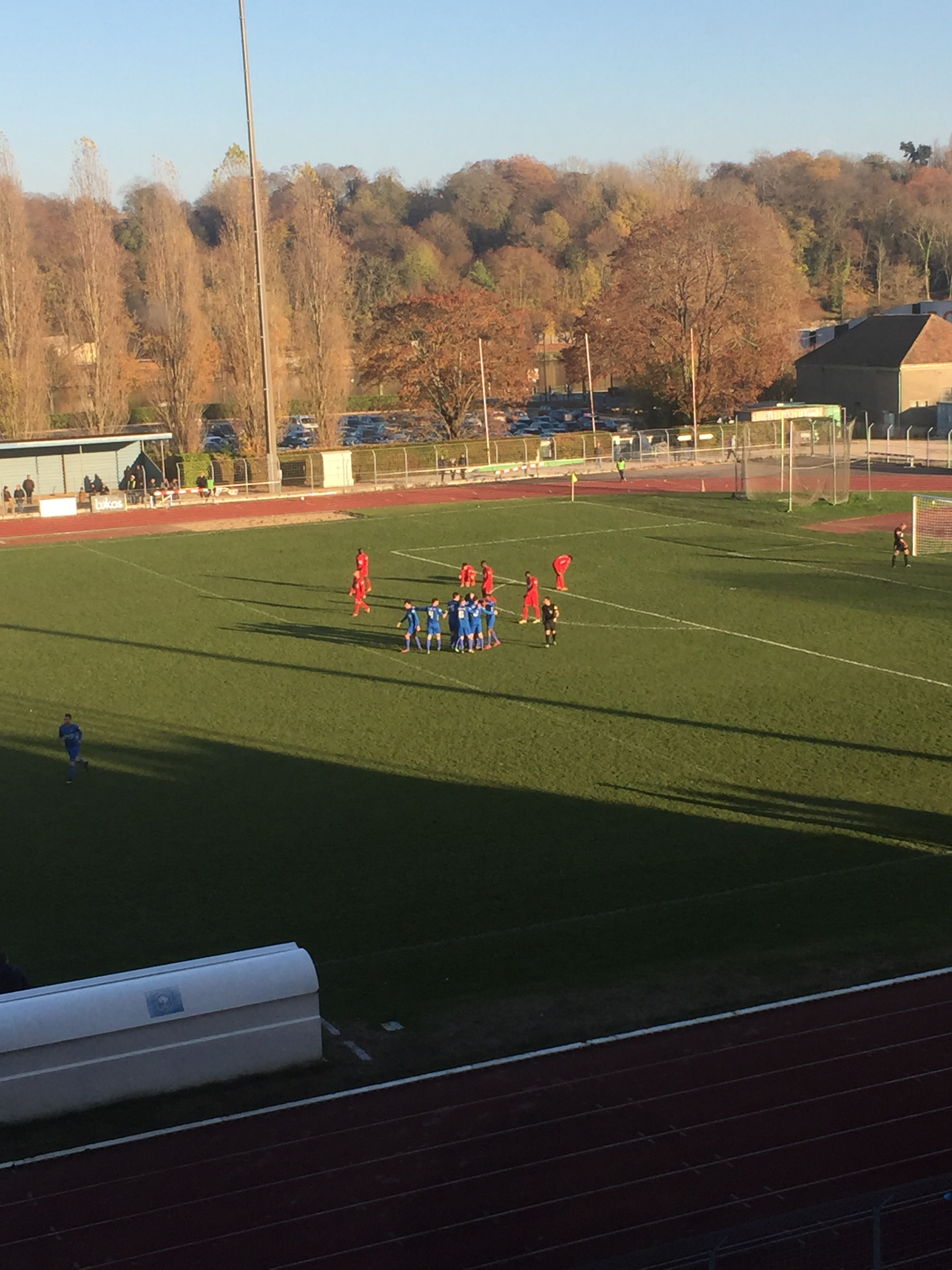
Match between FC Melun and FC Chamalières in the 2018–19 Coupe de France.
