= 1987–88 French Division 2 =

49th season of the second-tier football league in France

Division 2
- Season: 1987–88

Statistics of Division 2 in the 1987–88 season.

== Overview ==
It was contested by 36 teams, and Sochaux-Montbéliard and RC Strasbourg won the championship.

== League tables ==
=== Group A ===
Pos	Team	Pld	W	D	L	GF	GA	GD	Pts	Promotion or relegation
1	Sochaux	34	29	3	2	97	17	+80	61	Promoted
2	Lyon	34	18	8	8	65	44	+21	44	
3	Alès	34	15	11	8	39	30	+9	41	
4	Montceau	34	16	8	10	44	42	+2	40	
5	Orléans	34	13	10	11	42	39	+3	36	
6	Nîmes	34	15	6	13	40	40	0	36	
7	Cuiseaux Louhans	34	12	9	13	35	34	+1	33	
8	Bastia	34	15	3	16	41	52	−11	33	
9	Grenoble	34	11	10	13	48	61	−13	32	
10	Gueugnon	34	11	9	14	32	28	+4	31	
11	Martigues	34	9	13	12	41	42	−1	31	
12	Sète	34	8	13	13	34	46	−12	29	
13	Le Puy	34	10	8	16	39	46	−7	28	
14	Istres	34	10	8	16	39	48	−9	28	
15	Dijon	34	9	10	15	26	40	−14	28	
16	Gazélec Ajaccio	34	9	9	16	29	44	−15	27	Relegated
17	Tours	34	10	7	17	25	40	−15	27	Relegated
18	Châtellerault	34	10	7	17	26	49	−23	27	Relegated

Source: rsssf.com

=== Group B ===
Pos	Team	Pld	W	D	L	GF	GA	GD	Pts	Promotion or relegation
1	Strasbourg	34	20	9	5	56	22	+34	49	Promoted
2	Caen	34	20	9	5	54	22	+32	49	Promoted
3	Mulhouse	34	19	7	8	49	31	+18	45	
4	Rouen	34	16	8	10	65	46	+19	40	
5	Nancy	34	13	12	9	44	31	+13	38	
6	Angers	34	14	10	10	39	38	+1	38	
7	Reims	34	12	11	11	42	40	+2	35	
8	Dunkerque	34	11	12	11	34	34	0	34	
9	Valenciennes	34	10	13	11	35	43	−8	33	
10	Rennes	34	11	10	13	33	33	0	32	
11	Abbeville	34	11	9	14	31	36	−5	31	
12	Guingamp	34	9	13	12	42	55	−13	31	
13	Beauvais	34	9	13	12	23	37	−14	31	
14	Quimper	34	10	9	15	42	43	−1	29	
15	La Roche sur Yon	34	9	8	17	33	40	−7	26	
16	St Dizier	34	9	7	18	25	40	−15	25	Relegated
17	Melun-Fontainebleau	34	7	9	18	23	46	−23	23	Relegated
18	Lorient	34	6	11	17	34	67	−33	23	Relegated

Source: rsssf.com

== Championship play-offs ==
Team 1	Agg.	Team 2	1st leg	2nd leg
Sochaux	1–3	Strasbourg	1–2	0–1

== Promotion play-offs ==
Quarter-final
2A	Lyon	4
3B	Mulhouse	0
2B	Caen (p)	1 (3)
3A	Alès	1 (2)

Semi-final
2A	Lyon	2	0	2
2B	Caen	1	2	3

Final
18	Niort	1	0	1
2B	Caen	1	3	4

== Top goalscorers ==
Rank	Player	Club (Grp)	Goals
1	(France) Patrick Martet	Rouen (B)	26
2	(Scotland) Ray Stephen	Nancy (A)	21
3	(France) Didier Monczuk	Quimper (B)	20
4	(France) Jean-Pierre Orts	Lyon (A)	18
4	(France) Stéphane Paille	Sochaux (A)	18
6	(France) Philippe Prieur	Caen (B)	17
6	(France) Christophe Rempp	Montceau-les-Mines (A)	17
6	(Socialist Federal Republic of Yugoslavia) Adriano Fegic	Dunkerque (B)	17
6	(France) Guy Mengual	Sète (A)	17
6	(West Germany) Peter Reichert	Strasbourg (B)	17
