= Entente Melun-Fontainebleau 77 =

Football club in Melun and Fontainebleau, France

Melun-Fontainebleau
- Full name: Entente Melun-Fontainebleau 77
- Short name: Entente MF77
- Founded: 1987
- Dissolved: 1988

Entente Melun-Fontainebleau 77 was a football club located in the towns of Melun and Fontainebleau, France. It was founded in 1987 as a result of a merger between CS Fontainebleau and US Melun, but the club split in 1988. CS Fontainebleau returned to their former name, while US Melun merged with Dammarie-lès-Lys to create Sporting Melun-Dammarie 77.

The club played only one season, during which it competed in the Division 2. The team finished in the relegation zone. In the Coupe de France, they were eliminated in the round of 64, having lost 2–1 to Division 3 club Évreux.

== Notable players ==
- (Hungary) Győző Burcsa
- (France) Lilian Thuram (youth)
