= FC Melun =

Football club in Melun, France

Melun
- Full name: Football Club de Melun
- Founded: 1894
- Stadium: Stade Municipal de Melun
- Capacity: 6,494
- President: Cédric Guilloso
- League: Régional 2 Paris Île-de-France; Group A
- Website: https://fc-melun.fr/

Football Club de Melun is a football club located in Melun, France. As of the 2021–22 season, it competes in the Régional 2, the seventh tier of French football.

== History ==
The club was founded as US Melun in 1894.

In the 1970s and 1980s, the club competed mostly in the Division 3, but reached the Division 2 on two occasions, during the 1977–78 and 1987–88 seasons. The second occasion the club reached the Division 2, it was as Entente Melun-Fontainebleau 77, the club that formed from a merger in 1987 between CS Fontainebleau and US Melun. However, in 1988, the Entente split, and Melun merged with Dammarie-lès-Lys to create a new club called in Sporting Melun-Dammarie 77. In 1992, the club took the new name of FC Melun and was administratively relegated several divisions.

=== Name changes ===
- 1894–1987: US Melun
- 1987–1988: Entente Melun-Fontainebleau 77 (merged with CS Fontainebleau for one season)
- 1988–1992: Sporting Melun-Dammarie 77 (merged with Dammarie-lès-Lys)
- 1992–present: FC Melun

== Notable former players ==
- (Mauritius) Arassen Ragaven
- (France) Lilian Thuram (youth)
- (France) Claude Makélélé (youth)

== Honours ==
FC Melun honours
Honour	No.	Years
Division d'Honneur Paris	1	1973–74
