= US Sénart-Moissy =

French football club

Sénart-Moissy
- Full name: L’Union Sportive Sénart-Moissy
- Founded: 24 September 1932
- Ground: Stade André Trémet; Moissy-Cramayel
- Capacity: 2,500 (2,200 seats)
- Chairman: Frank Thomas
- Manager: Patty Badjoko
- League: Regional 1 Île-de-France
- 2017–18: National 3 Group L, 14th (relegated)
- Website: https://www.senartmoissy.fr

US Sénart-Moissy is a French football club based in Moissy-Cramayel, France.

== History ==
It was founded on 24 September 1932 and plays at the Stade André Trémet, which has a capacity of 2,500. The club colour is blue.

== Notable former players ==
- (France) Ted Kelton Agasson
- (France) Kingsley Coman (youth)
- (Senegal) Papy Djilobodji
- (France) Lucas Gourna-Douath (youth)
- (France) Adrien Hunou
- (Democratic Republic of the Congo) Chris Mavinga
- (Democratic Republic of the Congo) Granddi Ngoyi
- (Senegal) Mickaël Tavares

== Honours ==
- Division d'Honneur Paris: 1996
- Championnat de France Amateur 2 Group B: 2002
