= RCP Fontainebleau =

Football club in Fontainebleau, France

Fontainebleau
- Full name: Racing Club du Pays de Fontainebleau
- Founded: 1912
- Stadium: Stade de la Faisanderie
- Capacity: 2,000
- President: Martinho Sapateiro
- Manager: Georges De Castro
- League: Départemental 1 Paris Île-de-France, Seine-et-Marne
- 2019–20: Départemental 2 Paris Île-de-France, Seine-et-Marne: Promoted
- Website: https://www.rcpfontainebleau.fr/

Racing Club du Pays de Fontainebleau is a football club located in Fontainebleau, France. The club competes in the Départemental 1, the ninth tier of French football.

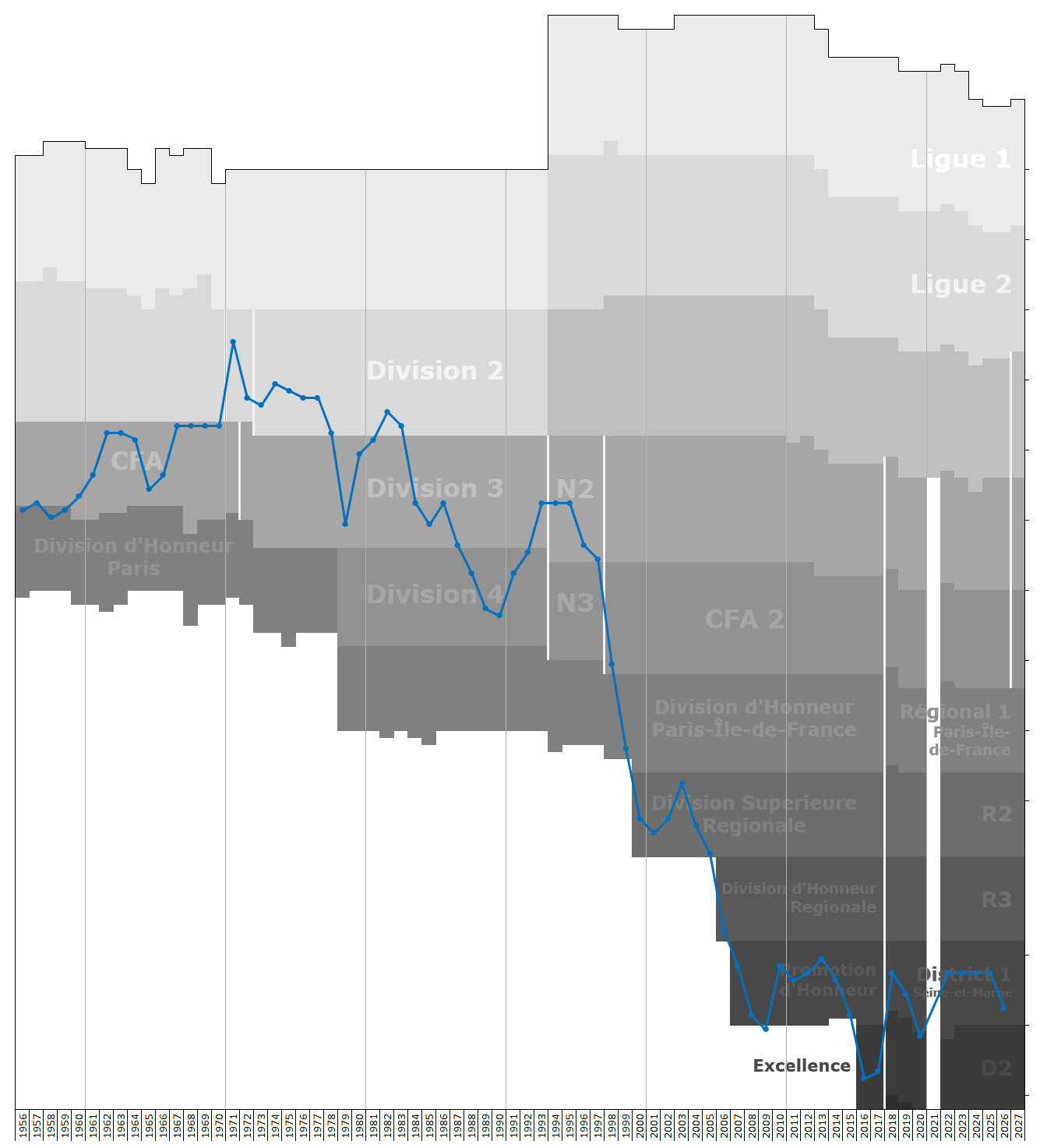
Historical league performance chart of RCP Fontainebleau

== Notable players ==
- (France) Tanguy Nianzou
- (France) Christopher Nkunku (youth)
- (France) Lilian Thuram (youth)

== Notable managers ==
- (France) Alfred Aston
- (France) Eddie Hudanski
- (France) Francisco Rubio

== Name changes ==
- 1912–1966: Club Sportif de Fontainebleau
- 1966–1978: Entente Bagneaux-Fontainebleau-Nemours (merged with AS Bagneaux-Nemours)
- 1978–1987: Club Sportif de Fontainebleau
- 1987–1988: Entente Melun-Fontainebleau 77 (merged with US Melun for one season)
- 1988–1999: Club Sportif de Fontainebleau
- 1999–present: Racing Club du Pays de Fontainebleau

== Honours ==
RCP Fontainebleau honours
Honour	No.	Years
Division d'Honneur Paris	2	1955–56, 1958–59
Championnat de France Amateur runner-up (Note: The three times the club finished runner-up in the Championnat de France Amateur was during its time as Entente BFN.)	3	1966–67, 1967–68, 1968–69
Division 3 runner-up	1	1980–81
