= Sékou Baradji =

Sékou Baradji or Sekou Baradji may refer to:

- Sekou Baradji (footballer, born 1984), French football midfielder
- Sékou Baradji (footballer, born 1995), French football forward
