= 2024–25 Coupe de France preliminary rounds, Paris-Île-de-France =

The 2024–25 Coupe de France preliminary rounds, Paris-Île-de-France was the qualifying competition to decide which teams from the leagues of the Paris-Île-de-France region of France took part in the main competition from the seventh round.

A total of eleven teams progressed from the Paris-Île-de-France preliminary rounds.

In 2023–24, Racing Club de France Football were the team from the region that progressed furthest in the main competition, reaching the Round of 32 before being narrowly beaten by Ligue 1 side Lille OSC.

== Draws and fixtures ==
As in previous seasons, the region held the first two preliminary rounds after the end of the previous season, in May and June 2024. On 16 April 2024, the league announced that 481 clubs in total from the region had entered the competition, and that there would be 179 ties in the first round, featuring teams from the district-level leagues. On 23 April 2024, the league confirmed some changes to the clubs entered. On 14 May 2024, the draw for the second round was published, with the teams from the regional-level leagues entering at this stage, and 133 matches drawn. Because these rounds took place at the end of the 2023–24 season, the teams from the region that qualified for promotion to 2024–25 Championnat National 3 participated in the second round.

On 16 July 2024, the league outlined the plans for the remainder of the competition. To meet the target number of teams in each round, 13 teams in the draw for the third round were exempted to the fourth round. On 27 August 2024, the 13 exempted teams were published. The 67 ties of the third round were published by 3 September 2024, and were posted on the leagues social channels on 13 September 2024. The 42 matches of the fourth round, which saw the teams from Championnat National 2 enter the competition, were drawn on 17 September 2024. The fifth round saw the entry of the teams from Championnat National enter the draw, with 22 matches drawn on 1 October 2024. The 11 sixth round ties were drawn on 15 October 2024.

=== First round ===
These matches were played between 12 and 23 May 2024. Tiers refer to the 2023–24 season.

First Round Results: Paris-Île-de-France
Tie no	Home team (Tier)	Score	Away team (Tier)
1.	AC Créteil (10)	3–2	AS Paris (9)
2.	US Lagny Messagers (12)	2–2 (5–6 p)	Guyane FC Paris (12)
3.	Juziers FC (13)	2–3	CSM Eaubonne (11)
4.	EF Jean Mendez (13)	5–0	FCO Vigneux (11)
5.	Neuilly-Plaisance FC (12)	3–3 (4–5 p)	USF Trilport (10)
6.	FC Saint-Arnoult (12)	2–6	JSC Pitray-Olier (10)
7.	Magny-le-Hongre FC (10)	3–4	Étoile Bobigny (10)
8.	AS Lieusaint (10)	3–9	Dourdan Sport (10)
9.	La Camillienne Sports 12ème (9)	2–2 (2–3 p)	CSM Clamart Foot (10)
10.	ES Vauxoise (11)	0–0 (2–4 p)	AS Vexin (12)
11.	UF Clichois (10)	5–0 (Note: Tie won by means of forfeit.)	US Paris XIème (11)
12.	Interfoot 78 (12)	1–2	AS Cheminots Ouest (11)
13.	ES Moussy-le-Neuf (12)	2–3	FC Bourget (9)
14.	Courtry Foot (11)	0–4	CA Romainville (11)
15.	Marolles FC (10)	5–0	FC Bois-le-Roi (11)
16.	AS Mesnil-le-Roi (12)	3–3 (5–4 p)	Kingdom Sport (11)
17.	AJ Antony (12)	1–4	FC Étampes (10)
18.	FC Puiseux-Louvres (11)	1–2	CS Courtry Académie (11)
19.	CSM Rosny-sur-Seine (11)	15–1	FC Domont (12)
20.	Entente Beaumont Mours (12)	0–1	Championnet Sports Paris (10)
21.	CA Combs-la-Ville (10)	1–1 (4–2 p)	TU Verrières-le-Buisson (10)
22.	AS Fontenaisienne (12)	1–5	SFC Bailly Noisy-le-Roi (9)
23.	CS Le Port-Marly (13)	5–1	Antony Football Evolution (12)
24.	FC Région Houdanaise (10)	5–3	AS Éragny FC (10)
25.	FC Jouy-le-Moutier (9)	9–3	US Chanteloup-les-Vignes (10)
26.	US Roissy-en-Brie (10)	5–0	Sevran FC (9)
27.	FC Vaujours (11)	7–1	Ménilmontant FC 1871 (12)
28.	FC Varennes 77 (11)	0–3	Milly Gâtinais FC (11)
29.	CS Ternes Paris-Ouest (12)	2–1	ES Marly-la-Ville (9)
30.	AJ Étampoise (11)	6–4	US Ponthierry (11)
31.	ES Brie Nord (11)	3–1	Trops FC (12)
32.	SS Voltaire Châtenay-Malabry (10)	5–0	AS Centre de Paris (11)
33.	Créteil Football Acadamie (12)	3–2	AS Collégien (11)
34.	US Montesson (10)	1–3	FC Deuil-Enghien (10)
35.	Osny FC (9)	4–0	SO Houilles (9)
36.	AS Évry-Courcouronnes (11)	2–2 (4–5 p)	USM Verneuil-l'Étang (11)
37.	ES Pays de Bière (10)	2–0	FC Wissous (11)
38.	Enfants de la Goutte d'Or (9)	6–3	LSO Colombes (10)
39.	ASM Chambourcy (10)	1–1 (3–5 p)	ACS Cormeillais (10)
40.	Villeneuve-La-Garenne Foot 92 (13)	3–2	FC Auvers-Ennery (12)
41.	FC Gagny (11)	6–2	Association Zenaga de Figuig (11)
42.	Juvisy AF Essonne (12)	4–2	Mimosa Mada-Sport (12)
43.	US Verneuil-sur-Seine (11)	3–0	USM Malakoff (9)
44.	Brie FC (10)	3–3 (4–5 p)	US Roissy-en-France (11)
45.	Valenton FA (12)	2–2 (6–5 p)	Gatinais Val de Loing FC (11)
46.	Olympique Mantes (13)	2–8	FC Groslay (9)
47.	Entente Longueville Sainte-Colombe Saint-Loup-de-Naud Soisy-Bouy (12)	2–3	FC Trois Vallées (12)
48.	Grigny FC (11)	1–3	FC Moret-Veneux Sablons (11)
49.	Val d'Europe FC (9)	1–0	FC Coubronnais (10)
50.	US Jouy-en-Josas (11)	3–1	FC Portugais US Ris-Orangis (11)
51.	ES Montreuil (10)	2–0	Pays Créçois FC (10)
52.	Drancy FC (10)	11–5	AC Villenoy (11)
53.	FC Nandy (11)	3–3 (2–4 p)	FC Épinay Athletico (11)
54.	US Le Pecq (10)	1–3	Nicolaïte Chaillot Paris (10)
55.	ES Saint-Pathus-Oissery (12)	5–1	ASE Puiseux-en-France (12)
56.	Marles AC (12)	1–7	AC Gentilly (10)
57.	Portugais Académica Champigny (12)	0–2	Racing Club 18ème (11)
58.	AS Beauchamp (12)	0–3	AS Nanteuil-lès-Meaux (10)
59.	Olympique Paris 15 (12)	5–3	Les Petits Pains (13)
60.	SS Noiseau (12)	0–1	US Ville d'Avray (10)
61.	ASM La Ferté-sous-Jouarre (12)	0–10	FC Nogent-sur-Marne (9)
62.	USL Presles (12)	0–5	CS Pouchet Paris XVII (10)
63.	ASS Noiséenne (10)	4–1	FC Brunoy (11)
64.	Ballancourt FC (13)	5–0	FC Coignières (11)
65.	US Avonnaise (9)	0–5	Saint-Michel FC 91 (9)
66.	FO Plaisirois (10)	6–0	ES Frettoise (11)
67.	ES Guyancourt (10)	2–1	CA L'Haÿ-les-Roses (10)
68.	Maisons-Laffitte FC (11)	2–6	RC Gonesse (9)
69.	Magny-en-Vexin FC (11)	0–3	Vinsky FC (11)
70.	ALJ Limay (10)	0–1	FCM Vauréal (10)
71.	CO Cachan (10)	6–2	FC Antillais Paris 19ème (11)
72.	AS Saint-Germain-lès-Arpajon (12)	2–10	CSM Bonneuil-sur-Marne (9)
73.	FC Achères (12)	2–8	US Persan (9)
74.	FC Bourg-La-Reine (13)	2–5	US Villeneuve Ablon (9)
75.	Olympique Loing (10)	3–6	Breuillet FC (10)
76.	FC Lissois (10)	5–0	Entente Bagneaux Nemours Saint-Pierre (10)
77.	ES Plateau de Saclay (12)	1–1 (1–4 p)	ES Villiers-sur-Marne (10)
78.	Garches Vaucresson FC (13)	5–2	ES Villabé (10)
79.	FC Maurecourt (11)	3–3 (5–6 p)	ES Herblay (11)
80.	Boissy UJ (12)	0–7	Draveil FC (9)
81.	FC Saint-Germain-Saintry-Saint-Pierre (10)	3–3 (2–4 p)	ASA Montereau (10)
82.	AJSC Nanterre (10)	2–4	SFC Champagne 95 (9)
83.	Fosses FU (12)	3–3 (4–3 p)	FC Andrésy (11)
84.	FC Longjumeau (10)	7–2	Dammarie City (10)
85.	AS Montigny-le-Bretonneux (10)	2–2 (4–3 p)	ASL Janville Lardy (11)
86.	SFC Canaverois (12)	2–4	FC Émerainville (11)
87.	Aubergenville FC (10)	0–0 (4–2 p)	CSA Kremlin-Bicêtre (10)
88.	Soisy-Andilly-Margency FC (10)	3–2	AS Carrières Grésillons (10)
89.	USA Feucherolles (12)	5–0	Association Le Perou en Bleu (12)
90.	Aigle Fertoise Boissy le Cutté (11)	5–3	FC Dammarie-lès-Lys (10)
91.	FC Coudraysien (12)	2–3	Élan Chevilly-Larue (9)
92.	AS Saint-Mard (11)	1–4	ÉS Paris (12)
93.	AS Chaumontel Luzarches (12)	2–2 (4–5 p)	Bann'Zanmi (12)
94.	Phare Sportive Zarzissien (12)	2–2 (3–4 p)	Paris SC (10)
95.	AGS Essarts-le-Roi (12)	1–2	SCM Châtillonnais (11)
96.	AS Guerville-Arnouville (12)	3–3 (4–2 p)	Enfants de Passy Paris (10)
97.	US Ézanville-Écouen (12)	3–0	JA Paris (12)
98.	Parmain AC (12)	0–0	Poissy FC (9)
99.	US Villecresnes (11)	2–3	FC Saint Vrain (11)
100.	Stade de Vanves (9)	4–3	Espérance Paris 19ème (9)
101.	Fontenay-en-Parisis FC (11)	0–5	USA Clichy (9)
102.	FC Asnières (10)	1–1 (4–5 p)	ASC Vélizy (11)
103.	AS Rebais (12)	0–6	FC Villepinte (10)
104.	CPS Provinois (11)	2–1	AP Sainte-Mélanie (12)
105.	EFC Ecquevilly (12)	1–2	FC Écouen (9)
106.	US Saclas-Méréville (12)	1–3	US Ormesson-sur-Marne (9)
107.	Villepreux FC (12)	0–1	SC Épinay-sur-Orge (11)
108.	US Montsoult-Baillet-Maffliers (11)	2–3	USC Mantes (12)
109.	Bouffémont ACF (11)	3–3 (5–4 p)	ASC Parisii (11)
110.	FC Fontenay-le-Fleury (11)	1–5	ESC XVème (11)
111.	US Carrières-sur-Seine (11)	1–4	FC Montmorency (11)
112.	Montmagny FC (11)	3–3 (5–6 p)	Gargenville Stade (10)
113.	RC Arpajonnais (12)	0–15	FC Villennes-Orgeval (11)
114.	AS Le Pin-Villevaude (10)	3–0	JS Villetaneuse (10)
115.	USD Ferrières-en-Brie (11)	1–5	SO Rosny-sous-Bois (11)
116.	FC Servon (9)	1–2	FC Orsay-Bures (9)
117.	CS Villetaneuse (10)	4–4 (5–4 p)	FC Le Chesnay 78 (9)
118.	Villeneuve AFC (10)	2–2 (5–4 p)	Morsang-sur-Orge FC (10)
119.	USO Athis-Mons (12)	2–2 (4–5 p)	FC Grand Paris 21 (12)
120.	AS Champs-sur-Marne (11)	2–0	AS Grenelle (12)
121.	Pierrefitte FC (11)	2–0	AS Arnouville (10)
122.	GAFE Plessis-Bouchard (10)	1–13	USBS Épône (10)
123.	Bougival Foot (12)	0–4	Évry FC (9)
124.	CSM Île-Saint-Denis (11)	0–0 (8–7 p)	UMS Pontault-Combault (10)
125.	Entente Pays du Limours (10)	4–2	Vaux-le-Pénil La Rochette FC (11)
126.	AJ Limeil-Brévannes (10)	5–0	FC Champenois-Mammesien-Vernoucellois (11)
127.	FC Bonnières-sur-Seine Freneuse (13)	2–6 (Note: Épinay Académie penalised for fielding a suspended player, FC Bonnières-sur-Seine Freneuse qualify.)	Épinay Académie (9)
128.	US Yvelines (13)	2–2 (2–4 p)	OC Gif Section Foot (11)
129.	FC Villiers-Saint-Georges (11)	4–4 (3–4 p)	FC Gournay (11)
130.	FC Plateau Bréval Longnes (12)	6–2	AS Menucourt (10)
131.	ES Étang-Saint-Nom (13)	0–3	AS Espoirs Grand Paris (12)
132.	AS Ballainvilliers (11)	2–1	USC Lesigny (10)
133.	AFC Saint-Cyr (13)	1–8	Marcoussis Nozay La-Ville-du-Bois FC (9)
134.	Bondoufle AC (10)	4–1	RCP Fontainebleau (9)
135.	Atletico Bagnolet (9)	2–0	FC Cosmo 77 (10)
136.	US Boissise-Pringy-Orgenoy (10)	6–0 (Note: Tie reversed from original draw)	AS Horizon Aventure (13)
137.	US Mauloise (10)	1–2	ES Seizième (9)
138.	Thorigny FC (10)	3–0	OFC Couronnes (9)
139.	Bussy Saint-Georges FC (10)	2–4	UJA Maccabi Paris Métropole (9)
140.	FC Mormant (10)	0–3	AS Itteville (10)
141.	Val de France Foot (10)	2–4	Neuilly-Plaisance FC (10)
142.	US Ris-Orangis (10)	3–2	AS Bois d'Arcy (10)
143.	FC Boussy-Quincy (10)	4–3	Savigny-le-Temple FC (9)
144.	Sport Yerres Benfica (13)	2–7	'USM Villeparisis (9)
145.	AS Courdimanche (11)	5–1	FC Saint-Germain-en-Laye (10)
146.	SO Vertois (13)	0–4	COSM Arcueil (11)
147.	USM Viroflay (12)	0–0	Tremplin Foot (9)
148.	CS Mennecy (10)	3–4	US Lognes (9)
149.	US Quincy-Voisins FC (10)	2–2 (4–5 p)	OC Ivry (11)
150.	ASF Guitrancourt (13)	2–2 (5–7 p)	Olympique Viarmes Asnières-sur-Oise (11)
151.	FC Villiers-sur-Orge (13)	0–7	Paris Université Club (9)
152.	FC Boissy-sous-Saint-Yon (13)	0–6	FC Rambouillet Yvelines (9)
153.	Le Raincy FC (12)	3–6	Portugais Pontault-Combault (10)
154.	AS Fourqueux (13)	3–8	JS Pontoisienne (11)
155.	FC Boissy-Saint-Léger (11)	0–0 (Note: Both teams penalised, no winner qualified for next round. Reason currently unknown.)	AS La Plaine Victoire (12)
156.	SC Briard (10)	1–4	ES Caudacienne (11)
157.	OSC Élancourt (10)	1–3	Cosmos Saint-Denis FC (10)
158.	AS Neuville-sur-Oise (11)	0–2	US Marly-le-Roi (9)
159.	FC Vallée 78 (10)	2–2 (5–3 p)	ES Montgeron (11)
160.	AJ Mézières (12)	2–0	ES Saint-Prix (11)
161.	FC Saint-Mande (11)	2–2 (5–6 p)	AS Maurepas (9)
162.	Pierrelaye FC (11)	2–1	Voisins FC (9)
163.	JS Paris (11) (Note: JS Paris replaced JA Montrouge in the original draw.)	1–9	Marcouville City Cergy-Pontoise (11)
164.	Viking Club de Paris (11)	0–6	Olympique Neuilly (9)
165.	Champs FFC (11)	0–1	Paris IFA (10)
166.	Académie Football Paris 18 (11)	3–0	Entente Santeny Périgny Mandres (12) (Note: Entente Santeny Périgny Mandres replaced Lions FC Magnanville in the original draw.)
167.	ES Paris XIII (9)	1–1 (11–10 p)	Flamboyants Villepinte (9)
168.	Entente Méry-Mériel Bessancourt (10)	0–0 (Note: Entente Méry-Mériel Bessancourt penalised for fielding an ineligible player, AS Bucheloise qualify.)	AS Bucheloise (10)
169.	ES Petit Anges Paris (12)	0–1	Triel AC (12)
170.	FC Vitry 94 Academie (12)	2–5	AS Bon Conseil (12)
171.	FC Villetaneuse (12)	1–4	CA Paris 14 (9)
172.	US Vaires-sur-Marne (9)	6–1	FC Romainville (10)
173.	FC Guignes (12)	2–4 (Note: The original match on 12 May 2024 was abandoned after 76 minutes due to an unplayable pitch. The league demanded the match be replayed on 19 May 2024.)	ES Vitry (9)
174.	AS Sud Essonne (11)	3–1	FC Bry (10)
175.	US Croissy (12)	0–7	FC Moldavie (12)
176.	Sèvres FC 92 (9)	4–0 (Note: The original match on 12 May 2024 was abandoned after 65 minutes due to an unplayable pitch. The league demanded the match be replayed on 19 May 2024.)	CO Savigny (9)
177.	FC Chaville (11)	0–0 (3–2 p) (Note: The original match on 12 May 2024 was abandoned after 72 minutes due to an unplayable pitch. The league demanded the match be replayed on 19 May 2024.)	USM Les Clayes-sous-Bois (12)
178.	USO Bezons (10)	3–1	CS Cellois (11)
179.	Coulommiers Brie (10)	– (Note: The original match on 12 May 2024 was not played due to the breakdown of AS Bondy's minibus. The league ordered the match be played on 19 May 2024, and later changed this date to 9 June 2024 due to the facilities at Coulommiers Brie being unavailable. However on 28 May 2024, the appeals committee penalised AS Bondy and awarded the match to Coulommiers Brie.)	AS Bondy (10)

=== Second round ===
These matches were played between 8 and 16 June 2024. Tiers refer to the 2023–24 season.

Second Round Results: Paris-Île-de-France
Tie no	Home team (Tier)	Score	Away team (Tier)
1.	ES Seizième (9)	1–0	Saint-Brice FC (6)
2.	Paray FC (8)	0–1	FC Plessis-Robinson (6)
3.	Portugais Pontault-Combault (10)	1–2	Olympique Noisy-le-Sec (7)
4.	ES Herblay (11)	2–5 (Note: Olympique Paris 15 penalised for fielding a suspended player, ES Herblay qualify.)	Olympique Paris 15 (12)
5.	CA Paris 14 (9)	2–2 (4–5 p)	Osny FC (9)
6.	FC Trois Vallées (12)	0–8	CO Vincennes (7)
7.	FC Bourget (9)	2–1	CS Pouchet Paris XVII (10)
8.	FC Groslay (9)	5–1	Drancy FC (10)
9.	ES Cesson Vert Saint-Denis (8)	1–1 (1–4 p)	Saint-Michel FC 91 (9)
10.	AS Itteville (10)	2–2 (12–13 p)	ASF Le Perreux (7)
11.	USM Verneuil-l'Étang (11)	0–0 (3–4 p)	Milly Gâtinais FC (11)
12.	CSM Clamart Foot (10)	3–1	FC Épinay Athletico (11)
13.	FC Rambouillet Yvelines (9)	0–1	CO Les Ulis (6)
14.	Saint-Thibault-des-Vignes FC (8)	0–8	AC Paris 15 (7)
15.	FC Émerainville (11)	3–1	Bouffémont ACF (11)
16.	Fosses FU (12)	1–1 (3–5 p)	Villeneuve-La-Garenne Foot 92 (13)
17.	AC Gentilly (10)	0–3	Le Mée Sports (6)
18.	Nicolaïte Chaillot Paris (10)	3–4	FCM Garges-lès-Gonesse (8)
19.	AS Cheminots Ouest (11)	4–2	Guyane FC Paris (12)
20.	FC Étampes (10)	1–3	AS Choisy-le-Roi (7)
21.	FC Plateau Bréval Longnes (12)	0–0 (Note: Tie won by means of forfeit.)	ES Nanterre (6)
22.	AJ Étampoise (11)	2–3 (Note: Tie reversed from original draw.)	ES Caudacienne (11)
23.	FC Moldavie (12)	5–0	ESC XVème (11)
24.	FC Orsay-Bures (9)	2–1	Champigny FC 94 (7)
25.	COSM Arcueil (11)	0–2	ASS Noiséenne (10)
26.	Poissy FC (9)	0–0 (5–3 p)	FC Jouy-le-Moutier (9)
27.	Paris Alésia FC (8)	1–4	US Vaires-sur-Marne (9)
28.	SFC Bailly Noisy-le-Roi (9)	2–0	CO Cachan (10)
29.	Étoile Bobigny (10)	3–0	AC Créteil (10)
30.	US Persan (9)	2–1	Thorigny FC (10)
31.	SC Épinay-sur-Orge (11)	2–1	FC Melun (7)
32.	FC Saint Vrain (11)	2–4	Thiais FC (8)
33.	ES Saint-Pathus-Oissery (12)	0–0 (5–6 p)	EF Jean Mendez (13)
34.	OC Ivry (11)	0–3	Cosmos Saint-Denis FC (10)
35.	OC Gif Section Foot (11)	1–1 (2–3 p)	CSM Rosny-sur-Seine (11)
36.	Olympique Neuilly (9)	0–1	US Villejuif (6)
37.	ASC Vélizy (11)	9–1	AS Ballainvilliers (11)
38.	USF Trilport (10)	2–4	FC Les Lilas (6)
39.	Élan Chevilly-Larue (9)	4–0	FC Courcouronnes (8)
40.	CSM Bonneuil-sur-Marne (9)	2–2 (5–3 p)	ES Paris XIII (9)
41.	Garches Vaucresson FC (13)	1–5	ES Guyancourt (10)
42.	FCM Vauréal (10)	5–0	AS Mesnil-le-Roi (12)
43.	FC Bonnières-sur-Seine Freneuse (13)	0–9	US Torcy (6)
44.	Paris SC (10)	3–3 (2–4 p)	Stade de Vanves (9)
45.	Val Yerres Crosne AF (6)	4–1	FC Moret-Veneux Sablons (11)
46.	USBS Épône (10)	0–3	FC Rueil Malmaison (7)
47.	AS Espoirs Grand Paris (12)	1–3	FC Gagny (11)
48.	FC Villennes-Orgeval (11)	2–0	Juvisy AF Essonne (12)
49.	AS Vexin (12)	0–5	Aubergenville FC (10)
50.	JS Pontoisienne (11)	3–4	AC Houilles (6)
51.	CSM Eaubonne (11)	0–3	Claye-Souilly SF (6)
52.	Saint-Cloud FC (8)	2–1	ES Trappes (7)
53.	USA Clichy (9)	2–2 (7–6 p)	ES Stains (8)
54.	CS Courtry Académie (11)	1–4	FC Franconville (8)
55.	Triel AC (12)	0–3	AF Garenne-Colombes (8)
56.	Dourdan Sport (10)	3–3 (4–3 p)	AJ Limeil-Brévannes (10)
57.	AS Montigny-le-Bretonneux (10)	0–6	UJA Maccabi Paris Métropole (9)
58.	CA Romainville (11)	6–0	US Ézanville-Écouen (12)
59.	Cosmo Taverny (8)	2–3	Courbevoie Sports (7)
60.	Vinsky FC (11)	0–2	Cergy Pontoise FC (6)
61.	Paris Université Club (9)	4–3	Marolles FC (10)
62.	Sèvres FC 92 (9)	3–2	US Sénart-Moissy (6)
63.	USC Mantes (12)	1–1 (4–2 p)	Marcouville City Cergy-Pontoise (11)
64.	CSM Île-Saint-Denis (11)	1–1 (5–6 p)	AS Courdimanche (11)
65.	Neuilly-Plaisance FC (10)	0–4	CS Meaux (6)
66.	FC Igny (7)	3–1	FC Issy-les-Moulineaux (8)
67.	Pierrelaye FC (11)	1–2	Sartrouville FC (7)
68.	CS Le Port-Marly (13)	0–5	ÉS Paris (12)
69.	US Roissy-en-France (11)	0–3	Blanc-Mesnil SF (6)
70.	Gargenville Stade (10)	0–4	Olympique Adamois (7)
71.	CPS Provinois (11)	1–3	OFC Pantin (8)
72.	CS Villetaneuse (10)	0–10	FC Mantois 78 (6)
73.	US Verneuil-sur-Seine (11)	1–2	FC Saint-Leu (7)
74.	Pierrefitte FC (11)	3–3 (1–4 p)	USM Villeparisis (9)
75.	US Ville d'Avray (10)	3–4	FC Vallée 78 (10)
76.	ES Villiers-sur-Marne (10)	6–3	Racing Club 18ème (11)
77.	Évry FC (9)	4–2	JS Suresnes (7)
78.	ACS Cormeillais (10)	1–1 (5–4 p)	Espérance Aulnay (6)
79.	ES Brie Nord (11)	0–4	FC Montfermeil (7)
80.	FC Deuil-Enghien (10)	3–3 (3–4 p)	UF Clichois (10)
81.	Paris IFA (10)	0–4	US Roissy-en-Brie (10)
82.	FC Montmorency (11)	0–3	Saint-Denis US (6)
83.	CA Combs-la-Ville (10)	2–1	FC Morangis-Chilly (7)
84.	Bann'Zanmi (12)	1–1 (5–6 p)	Académie Football Paris 18 (11)
85.	ASA Montereau (10)	5–3	Aigle Fertoise Boissy le Cutté (11)
86.	USA Feucherolles (12)	2–1	CSM Gennevilliers (8)
87.	FC Goussainville (8)	3–1	Saint-Maur VGA (7)
88.	AS Champs-sur-Marne (11)	2–7	Tremblay FC (7)
89.	US Jouy-en-Josas (11)	1–1 (3–4 p)	ES Viry-Châtillon (7)
90.	Valenton FA (12)	0–6	CSL Aulnay (7)
91.	Breuillet FC (10)	4–0	US Hardricourt (7)
92.	AS Le Pin-Villevaude (10)	0–3	Atletico Bagnolet (9)
93.	SS Voltaire Châtenay-Malabry (10)	6–1	FC Longjumeau (10)
94.	SCM Châtillonnais (11)	1–5	Championnet Sports Paris (10)
95.	FC Vaujours (11)	0–1	FC Ozoir-la-Ferrière 77 (8)
96.	FC Boussy-Quincy (10)	0–3	US Rungis (8)
97.	AS Guerville-Arnouville (12)	1–5	Argenteuil FC (7)
98.	Val d'Europe FC (9)	1–1 (7–6 p)	Villemomble Sports (7)
99.	Athletic Club de Boulogne-Billancourt (7)	1–1 (5–4 p)	AS Ermont (8)
100.	AS Nanteuil-lès-Meaux (10)	2–2 (2–4 p)	FC Livry-Gargan (7)
101.	US Villeneuve Ablon (9)	1–1 (2–4 p)	SC Gretz-Tournan (7)
102.	FC Chaville (11)	2–0	US Ormesson-sur-Marne (9)
103.	USO Bezons (10)	5–3	CS Ternes Paris-Ouest (12)
104.	JSC Pitray-Olier (10)	4–4 (4–2 p)	Villeneuve AFC (10)
105.	Conflans FC (7)	3–0	Villeneuve-La-Garenne Foot 92 (13)
106.	FC Grand Paris 21 (12)	6–2	SO Rosny-sous-Bois (11)
107.	ES Pays de Bière (10)	3–3 (4–2 p)	US Grigny (7)
108.	US Boissise-Pringy-Orgenoy (10)	0–1	CA Paris-Charenton (7)
109.	AS Maurepas (9)	3–2	US Palaiseau (7)
110.	Créteil Football Acadamie (12)	0–3	Stade de l'Est Pavillonnais (8)
111.	Bondoufle AC (10)	0–4	ASA Issy (8)
112.	SFC Champagne 95 (9)	2–1	Mitry Compans Goelly (7)
113.	AS Bucheloise (10)	0–6	CSM Puteaux (7)
114.	FC Région Houdanaise (10)	0–4	FC Villiers-le-Bel (8)
115.	AS Chelles (8)	1–5	FC Massy 91 (8)
116.	US Ris-Orangis (10)	4–5	Noisy-le-Grand FC (7)
117.	FC Écouen (9)	0–1	Neauphle-le-Château-Pontchartrain RC 78 (7)
118.	RC Gonesse (9)	2–2 (3–5 p)	US Fontenay-sous-Bois (8)
119.	FO Plaisirois (10)	0–0 (4–2 p)	RFC Argenteuil (7)
120.	FC Nogent-sur-Marne (9)	1–1 (3–0 p)	ES Montreuil (10)
121.	Entente Pays du Limours (10)	2–4	US Marly-le-Roi (9)
122.	FC Lissois (10)	1–2	Sucy FC (8)
123.	Draveil FC (9)	2–1	COM Bagneux (8)
124.	Marcoussis Nozay La-Ville-du-Bois FC (9)	1–6	ES Colombienne (7)
125.	Salésienne de Paris (8)	3–1	ASC La Courneuve (8)
126.	ES Parisienne (8)	0–2	Montreuil FC (7)
127.	AS Bon Conseil (12)	1–7	Soisy-Andilly-Margency FC (10)
128.	US Lognes (9)	0–0 (4–5 p)	AAS Sarcelles (7)
129.	FC Villepinte (10)	0–6	FC Maisons Alfort (8)
130.	Ballancourt FC (13)	1–0	USM Viroflay (12)
131.	Olympique Viarmes Asnières-sur-Oise (11)	5–1	Coulommiers Brie (10)
132.	AS Sud Essonne (11)	1–1 (4–5 p)	Enfants de la Goutte d'Or (9)
133.	FC Gournay (11)	1–3	ES Vitry (9)

=== Third round ===
These matches were played on 14 and 15 September 2024.

Third Round Results: Paris-Île-de-France
Tie no	Home team (Tier)	Score	Away team (Tier)
1.	FC Villiers-le-Bel (7)	0–1	US Lusitanos Saint-Maur (5)
2.	ASF Le Perreux (7)	1–0	Sainte-Geneviève Sports (5)
3.	FCM Vauréal (10)	2–1	OFC Les Mureaux (6)
4.	US Marly-le-Roi (9)	3–1	US Persan (9)
5.	FC Gagny (11)	2–0	ÉS Paris (12)
6.	Noisy-le-Grand FC (8)	0–0 (5–6 p)	US Villejuif (6)
7.	Aubergenville FC (9)	3–3 (4–2 p)	FCM Garges-lès-Gonesse (8)
8.	JSC Pitray-Olier (10)	1–0	USA Feucherolles (11)
9.	FC Bourget (10)	1–6	FC Saint-Leu (7)
10.	FC Nogent-sur-Marne (9)	2–1	ES Pays de Bière (10)
11.	Saint-Cloud FC (8)	0–4	AC Paris 15 (7)
12.	Atletico Bagnolet (9)	0–2	Claye-Souilly SF (6)
13.	ES Caudacienne (11)	0–3	ASA Montereau (9)
14.	AF Garenne-Colombes (7)	1–1 (6–5 p)	FC Franconville (8)
15.	CA Romainville (10)	1–3	FC Moldavie (11)
16.	Enfants de la Goutte d'Or (8)	2–2 (6–5 p)	FC Montfermeil (7)
17.	Sèvres FC 92 (9)	5–2	Étoile Bobigny (9)
18.	Soisy-Andilly-Margency FC (10)	0–4	JA Drancy (5)
19.	Salésienne de Paris (8)	0–3	Racing Club de France Football (5)
20.	ASC Vélizy (10)	3–0	SC Épinay-sur-Orge (10)
21.	AS Maurepas (10)	10–0	AF Paris 18 (11)
22.	Breuillet FC (10)	1–6	US Vaires-sur-Marne (9)
23.	ACS Cormeillais (9)	1–4	Tremblay FC (7)
24.	SFC Bailly Noisy-le-Roi (9)	2–2 (4–3 p)	Saint-Michel FC 91 (8)
25.	Thiais FC (8)	3–4	CO Les Ulis (6)
26.	FC Grand Paris 21 (12)	4–4 (4–5 p)	USM Villeparisis (9)
27.	ES Villiers-sur-Marne (10)	3–0 (Note: Tie won by means of forfeit.)	ASS Noiséenne (10)
28.	CSL Aulnay (7)	0–1	US Ivry (5)
29.	Olympique Viarmes Asnières-sur-Oise (11)	3–0	USC Mantes (13)
30.	Poissy FC (9)	0–1	ES Viry-Châtillon (8)
31.	Draveil FC (9)	2–3	CS Meaux (7)
32.	FC Chaville (11)	0–4	CO Vincennes (7)
33.	Courbevoie Sports (7)	2–1	Élan Chevilly-Larue (8)
34.	UJA Maccabi Paris Métropole (9)	0–3 (Note: UF Clichois penalised for fielding a suspended player. UJA Maccabi Paris Métropole qualify.)	UF Clichois (10)
35.	AS Cheminots Ouest (11)	0–2	FC Les Lilas (7)
36.	US Fontenay-sous-Bois (8)	2–4	AC Houilles (6)
37.	Neauphle-le-Château-Pontchartrain RC 78 (7)	1–1 (5–6 p)	Montrouge FC 92 (6)
38.	FC Livry-Gargan (8)	0–1	Val Yerres Crosne AF (6)
39.	FC Rueil Malmaison (8)	1–2	Entente SSG (5)
40.	ES Seizième (9)	3–5	FC Mantois 78 (6)
41.	USA Clichy (9)	1–1 (5–3 p)	AAS Sarcelles (6)
42.	Conflans FC (7)	6–0	FC Massy 91 (8)
43.	FC Émerainville (11)	0–4	OFC Pantin (8)
44.	ES Vitry (10)	4–3	CSM Rosny-sur-Seine (10)
45.	AS Courdimanche (11)	1–11	ES Colombienne (7)
46.	SFC Champagne 95 (9)	2–2 (1–4 p)	ASA Issy (8)
47.	CSM Clamart Foot (10)	2–2 (3–5 p)	AS Choisy-le-Roi (7)
48.	Osny FC (9)	0–3	Amicale Villeneuve-la-Garenne (7)
49.	US Rungis (7)	1–2	ESA Linas-Montlhéry (5)
50.	US Roissy-en-Brie (10)	3–2	Cosmos Saint-Denis FC (10)
51.	Athletic Club de Boulogne-Billancourt (7)	1–1 (6–5 p)	AS Saint-Ouen-l'Aumône (5)
52.	FC Ozoir-la-Ferrière 77 (8)	0–1	Saint-Denis US (6)
53.	FC Vallée 78 (10)	2–1	SS Voltaire Châtenay-Malabry (9)
54.	Dourdan Sport (11)	2–0	CA Combs-la-Ville (10)
55.	Ballancourt FC (13)	1–1 (2–4 p)	EF Jean Mendez (13)
56.	FC Goussainville (9)	3–1	Stade de l'Est Pavillonnais (8)
57.	FC Igny (7)	2–3	SFC Neuilly-sur-Marne (5)
58.	CA Paris-Charenton (7)	2–1	US Torcy (5)
59.	Sucy FC (9)	0–2	CS Brétigny (5)
60.	Argenteuil FC (7)	4–2	FC Maisons Alfort (8)
61.	ES Guyancourt (9)	1–2	ES Nanterre (6)
62.	FO Plaisirois (10)	2–2 (5–3 p)	Olympique Adamois (6)
63.	Montreuil FC (6)	1–1 (3–4 p)	CSM Puteaux (7)
64.	USO Bezons (9)	1–2	AS Chatou (5)
65.	Stade de Vanves (9)	0–0 (4–3 p)	CA Vitry (6)
66.	Championnet Sports Paris (10)	1–3	Olympique Noisy-le-Sec (7)
67.	Milly Gâtinais FC (12)	0–3	Le Mée Sports (6)

=== Fourth round ===
These matches were played on 28 and 29 September 2024.

Fourth Round Results: Paris-Île-de-France
Tie no	Home team (Tier)	Score	Away team (Tier)
1.	ASA Montereau (9)	2–1	SC Gretz-Tournan (7)
2.	USA Clichy (9)	3–0	AF Garenne-Colombes (7)
3.	Val Yerres Crosne AF (6)	2–1	US Ivry (5)
4.	Athletic Club de Boulogne-Billancourt (7)	0–0 (5–4 p)	US Lusitanos Saint-Maur (5)
5.	Blanc-Mesnil SF (7)	0–1	Montrouge FC 92 (6)
6.	ES Herblay (10)	2–1	Claye-Souilly SF (6)
7.	FC Gagny (11)	0–8	Racing Club de France Football (5)
8.	ES Nanterre (6)	1–2	CS Meaux (7)
9.	Aubergenville FC (9)	0–3	Tremblay FC (7)
10.	US Vaires-sur-Marne (9)	0–7	CS Brétigny (5)
11.	FC Vallée 78 (10)	0–2	CSM Bonneuil-sur-Marne (9)
12.	Dourdan Sport (11)	0–3	CA Paris-Charenton (7)
13.	Stade de Vanves (9)	2–3	AC Paris 15 (7)
14.	Paris Université Club (9)	6–2	USM Villeparisis (9)
15.	Sèvres FC 92 (9)	2–3	SFC Neuilly-sur-Marne (5)
16.	EF Jean Mendez (13)	0–4	FC Villennes-Orgeval (10)
17.	Olympique Noisy-le-Sec (7)	4–2	ES Colombienne (7)
18.	Sartrouville FC (9)	1–1 (3–4 p)	FC Plessis-Robinson (6)
19.	AS Maurepas (10)	1–7	Le Mée Sports (6)
20.	FO Plaisirois (10)	1–1 (4–5 p)	FCM Vauréal (10)
21.	Olympique Viarmes Asnières-sur-Oise (11)	1–7	FC Fleury 91 (4)
22.	ES Villiers-sur-Marne (10)	0–8	AC Houilles (6)
23.	AS Choisy-le-Roi (7)	1–2	JA Drancy (5)
24.	Évry FC (9)	3–3 (4–3 p)	Conflans FC (7)
25.	FC Nogent-sur-Marne (9)	0–5	US Villejuif (6)
26.	FC Moldavie (11)	3–2	ASA Issy (8)
27.	AS Chatou (5)	0–3	Saint-Denis US (6)
28.	FC Goussainville (9)	1–2	FCM Aubervilliers (4)
29.	FC Groslay (10)	2–2 (3–4 p)	Argenteuil FC (7)
30.	CSM Puteaux (7)	3–0	OFC Pantin (8)
31.	SFC Bailly Noisy-le-Roi (9)	3–3 (7–6 p)	Enfants de la Goutte d'Or (8)
32.	ES Vitry (10)	2–2 (4–2 p)	US Roissy-en-Brie (10)
33.	ES Viry-Châtillon (8	0–5	Entente SSG (5)
34.	FC Les Lilas (7)	1–3	Football Club 93 Bobigny-Bagnolet-Gagny (4)
35.	Val d'Europe FC (9)	1–3	ESA Linas-Montlhéry (5)
36.	FC Saint-Leu (7)	1–3	Courbevoie Sports (7)
37.	ASC Vélizy (10)	0–5	US Créteil-Lusitanos (4)
38.	US Marly-le-Roi (9)	0–0 (3–4 p)	FC Orsay-Bures (9)
39.	CO Vincennes (7)	4–1	Amicale Villeneuve-la-Garenne (7)
40.	UJA Maccabi Paris Métropole (9)	0–2	FC Mantois 78 (6)
41.	Cergy Pontoise FC (6)	2–1	ASF Le Perreux (7)
42.	JSC Pitray-Olier (10)	1–1 (4–5 p)	CO Les Ulis (6)

=== Fifth round ===
These matches were played on 12 and 13 October 2024.

Fifth Round Results: Paris-Île-de-France
Tie no	Home team (Tier)	Score	Away team (Tier)
1.	CS Brétigny (5)	1–0	Val Yerres Crosne AF (6)
2.	JA Drancy (5)	2–2 (4–2 p)	US Villejuif (6)
3.	Saint-Denis US (6)	2–1	Entente SSG (5)
4.	FCM Vauréal (10)	0–3	AC Paris 15 (7)
5.	SFC Bailly Noisy-le-Roi (9)	0–0 (4–5 p)	Cergy Pontoise FC (6)
6.	FC Moldavie (11)	0–3	Le Mée Sports (6)
7.	ES Herblay (10)	3–6	ESA Linas-Montlhéry (5)
8.	CA Paris-Charenton (7)	0–3	Paris 13 Atletico (3)
9.	USA Clichy (9)	0–2	FCM Aubervilliers (4)
10.	CSM Bonneuil-sur-Marne (9)	0–7	Football Club 93 Bobigny-Bagnolet-Gagny (4)
11.	AC Houilles (6)	1–1 (3–1 p)	Olympique Noisy-le-Sec (7)
12.	Montrouge FC 92 (6)	3–0	CO Vincennes (7)
13.	Paris Université Club (9)	2–2 (4–2 p)	FC Plessis-Robinson (6)
14.	FC Versailles 78 (3)	2–0 (Note: Tie reversed from original draw.)	FC Orsay-Bures (9)
15.	Argenteuil FC (7)	1–7	FC Fleury 91 (4)
16.	FC Villennes-Orgeval (10)	0–2	Racing Club de France Football (5)
17.	Tremblay FC (7)	2–0	CSM Puteaux (7)
18.	Courbevoie Sports (7)	2–3	SFC Neuilly-sur-Marne (5)
19.	Évry FC (9)	1–2	CO Les Ulis (6)
20.	ES Vitry (10)	3–3 (4–3 p)	ASA Montereau (9)
21.	FC Mantois 78 (6)	2–1	US Créteil-Lusitanos (4)
22.	CS Meaux (7)	1–1 (4–2 p)	Athletic Club de Boulogne-Billancourt (7)

=== Sixth round ===
These matches were played on 26 and 27 October 2024.

Sixth Round Results: Paris-Île-de-France
Tie no	Home team (Tier)	Score	Away team (Tier)
1.	CS Brétigny (5)	2–2 (4–3 p)	Paris 13 Atletico (3)
2.	Le Mée Sports (6)	0–2	AC Houilles (6)
3.	ES Vitry (10)	1–6	JA Drancy (5)
4.	Cergy Pontoise FC (6)	1–2	AC Paris 15 (7)
5.	Paris Université Club (9)	0–6	FCM Aubervilliers (4)
6.	Football Club 93 Bobigny-Bagnolet-Gagny (4)	4–0	Racing Club de France Football (5)
7.	Tremblay FC (7)	1–1 (0–3 p)	FC Versailles 78 (3)
8.	CO Les Ulis (6)	4–0	CS Meaux (7)
9.	ESA Linas-Montlhéry (5)	2–2 (3–1 p)	Montrouge FC 92 (6)
10.	Saint-Denis US (6)	0–4	FC Fleury 91 (4)
11.	SFC Neuilly-sur-Marne (5)	0–0(3–0 p)	FC Mantois 78 (6)
