= 2023–24 Coupe de France preliminary rounds, Paris-Île-de-France =

French football competition

The 2023–24 Coupe de France preliminary rounds, Paris-Île-de-France is the qualifying competition to decide which teams from the leagues of the Paris-Île-de-France region of France take part in the main competition from the seventh round.

A total of eleven teams will progress from the Paris-Île-de-France section of the 2023–24 Coupe de France preliminary rounds.

In 2022–23, ESA Linas-Montlhéry progressed furthest in the main competition, reaching the round of 64, where they lost to Lens.

== Draws and fixtures ==
On 18 April 2023, the league announced that 478 teams had entered thus far, and that two rounds of the competition would take place before the summer break. The first round, featuring 368 teams from the district level divisions, took place on the weekend of 21 May 2023, with 183 fixtures, and one team given a bye. 89 teams from the Regional level divisions entered at the second round on the weekend of 11 June 2023, to participate in 136 fixtures.

The third round draw, featuring the 12 teams from Championnat National 3 and five byes from the second round, was published on 30 August 2023, with nine clubs given byes to the fourth round. The fourth round draw, featuring the five teams from Championnat National 2 and nine byes from the third round, took place on 19 September 2023. The fifth round draw, featuring the two teams from Championnat National, took place on 3 October 2023. The sixth and final regional round draw was made on 18 October 2023.

=== First round ===
These matches were played on 18 and 21 May 2023, with three rearranged for 31 May 2023. Tiers relate to the 2022–23 season.

First Round Results: Paris-Île-de-France
| Tie no | Home team (Tier) | Score | Away team (Tier) |
|---|---|---|---|
| 1. | FC Longjumeau (10) | 2–1 | ES Paris XIII (10) |
| 2. | OFC Couronnes (10) | 3–0 (Note: Tie won by means of forfeit.) | FC Boissy-Saint-Léger (11) |
| 3. | Portugais Conflans (13) | 0–3 | Bussy Saint-Georges FC (9) |
| 4. | Juziers FC (13) | 1–6 | FC Groslay (9) |
| 5. | ES Seizième (9) | 0–1 | AS Bucheloise (10) |
| 6. | ES Villiers-sur-Marne (10) | 3–0 | FC Brie Est (11) |
| 7. | CS Le Port-Marly (13) | 0–3 (Note: The league ruled that the match be rearranged for 31 May 2023, after the original tie was incorrectly scheduled for an unsuitable pitch.) | Villeneuve AFC (11) |
| 8. | Bougival Foot (13) | 0–1 | CA L'Haÿ-les-Roses (10) |
| 9. | FC Deuil-Enghien (10) | 3–3 (3–5 p) | CA Paris 14 (9) |
| 10. | AS Tigery (13) | 0–3 | US Ponthierry (11) |
| 11. | AS Menucourt (10) | 5–0 | Trops FC (11) |
| 12. | AS Arnouville (11) | 1–4 | AS Cheminots Ouest (11) |
| 13. | FC Chauconin-Neufmontiers (11) | 0–3 | AS Bondy (10) |
| 14. | Magny-en-Vexin FC (12) | 4–1 | CS Courtry Académie (12) |
| 15. | AS Collégien (12) | 0–7 | Neuilly-Plaisance Sports (11) |
| 16. | AJ Étampoise (11) | 1–1 (11–10 p) | Olympique Loing (10) |
| 17. | Olympique Paris 15 (11) | 4–2 | FC Vitry 94 Academie (12) |
| 18. | Montmagny FC (12) | 2–4 | FC Romainville (11) |
| 19. | Parmain AC (11) | 3–3 (3–4 p) | FC Vaujours (11) |
| 20. | AS Beauchamp (11) | 3–0 | EFC Ecquevilly (11) |
| 21. | CA Romainville (12) | 1–2 | US Persan (9) |
| 22. | AS Guerville-Arnouville (12) | 2–2 (4–5 p) | ES Petit Anges Paris (11) |
| 23. | USF Trilport (10) | 1–6 | FC Villiers-le-Bel (9) |
| 24. | FC Saint-Germain-Saintry-Saint-Pierre (11) | 3–0 | US Ville d'Avray (9) |
| 25. | Triel AC (12) | 1–1 (3–4 p) | Stade de Vanves (9) |
| 26. | USM Malakoff (10) | 6–0 | FC Boussy-Quincy (10) |
| 27. | FC Villennes-Orgeval (11) | 3–3 (4–3 p) | Entente Pays du Limours (11) |
| 28. | FC Nandy (12) | 2–1 | JS Paris (12) |
| 29. | AS Nanteuil-lès-Meaux (10) | 1–1 (4–5 p) | FC Nogent-sur-Marne (9) |
| 30. | US Montesson (10) | 1–1 (4–3 p) | Pierrelaye FC (11) |
| 31. | Villepreux FC (11) | 2–5 | SC Épinay-sur-Orge (11) |
| 32. | FC Villiers-sur-Orge (13) | 1–4 | USA Feucherolles (13) |
| 33. | FC Bonnières-sur-Seine Freneuse (13) | 4–2 | AS Enfants de Gennevilliers (13) |
| 34. | Olympique Mantes (13) | 1–4 | ES Herblay (12) |
| 35. | Paris Université Club (9) | 4–1 | USBS Épône (9) |
| 36. | FC Le Chesnay 78 (9) | 0–0 (4–3 p) | ES Saint-Prix (10) |
| 37. | US Jouy-en-Josas (10) | 5–3 | Tremplin Foot (9) |
| 38. | ACS Cormeillais (10) | 5–0 | ESC XVème (11) |
| 39. | USM Viroflay (12) | 0–3 | Kingdom Sport (12) |
| 40. | Juvisy AF Essonne (12) | 6–3 | Mimosa Mada-Sport (12) |
| 41. | SFC Champagne 95 (9) | 4–3 | FC Asnières (10) |
| 42. | COSM Arcueil (11) | 3–3 (0–3 p) | AO Buc Foot (12) |
| 43. | FC Plateau Bréval Longnes (12) | 2–2 (3–5 p) | FC Jouy-le-Moutier (10) |
| 44. | Breuillet FC (10) | 2–3 | Voisins FC (9) |
| 45. | FC Auvers-Ennery (11) | 3–2 | US Paris XIème (11) |
| 46. | Maisons-Laffitte FC (12) | 3–0 | AS Outre-Mer du Bois l'Abbé (10) |
| 47. | Bouffémont ACF (12) | 2–6 | FC Villepinte (10) |
| 48. | Phare Sportive Zarzissien (12) | 0–2 | EF Jean Mendez (12) |
| 49. | Ménilmontant FC 1871 (12) | 0–8 | Thiais FC (9) |
| 50. | AS Champs-sur-Marne (10) | 0–3 | Élan Chevilly-Larue (9) |
| 51. | JA Montrouge (12) | 3–0 (Note: Game was initially shown as forfeit by both teams, but on 23 May the league revised this to award the tie to JA Montrouge.) | ASL Mesnil Saint-Denis (12) |
| 52. | Gatinais Val de Loing FC (12) | 3–3 (2–4 p) | Aigle Fertoise Boissy le Cutté (11) |
| 53. | Stade Français (12) | 1–0 | US Boissise-Pringy-Orgenoy (10) |
| 54. | FC Bry (10) | 1–2 | Dourdan Sport (10) |
| 55. | ESC Paris 20 (12) | 3–1 | FC Villetaneuse (12) |
| 56. | Aubergenville FC (10) | 0–2 | FCM Vauréal (10) |
| 57. | Dammarie City (11) | 3–0 | SO Vertois (13) |
| 58. | AS Fontenay-Saint-Père (12) | 3–0 | Benfica Argoselo Sports Paris (12) |
| 59. | FC Champenois-Mammesien-Vernoucellois (12) | 0–2 | AS Évry-Courcouronnes (12) |
| 60. | ES AS Bonnelles/AS Cernay/US 17 Tournants (13) | 0–3 | AS Sud Essonne (11) |
| 61. | FC Boissy-sous-Saint-Yon (13) | 0–0 (4–5 p) | FC Vallée 78 (9) |
| 62. | Interfoot 78 (13) | 3–1 | SCM Châtillonnais (10) |
| 63. | AC Villenoy (11) | 1–3 | Association Zenaga de Figuig (12) |
| 64. | Goellycompans FC (10) | 0–4 | ES Marly-la-Ville (9) |
| 65. | AS Lieusaint (10) | 0–7 | Marcoussis Nozay La-Ville-du-Bois FC (9) |
| 66. | AS Ballainvilliers (11) | 2–3 | FC Coignières (10) |
| 67. | FC Saint-Arnoult (13) | 2–5 | AS Saint-Germain-lès-Arpajon (13) |
| 68. | USM Verneuil-l'Étang (12) | 0–3 | CSM Bonneuil-sur-Marne (9) |
| 69. | ASL Janville Lardy (12) | 4–3 | CS Braytois (11) |
| 70. | TU Verrières-le-Buisson (10) | 2–2 (4–5 p) | CA Combs-la-Ville (10) |
| 71. | AS Neuville-sur-Oise (11) | 1–1 (6–7 p) | FC Fontenay-le-Fleury (11) |
| 72. | AS Fontenaisienne (13) | 3–0 | ES Pays de Bière (10) |
| 73. | Vernouillet FC (13) | 0–6 | CSM Île-Saint-Denis (11) |
| 74. | US Roissy-en-France (11) | 2–4 | FC Bourget (9) |
| 75. | Cosmos Saint-Denis FC (10) | 5–6 | CSM Clamart Foot (10) |
| 76. | AS Carrières Grésillons (10) | 4–4 (5–6 p) | JS Villetaneuse (10) |
| 77. | AS Centre de Paris (12) | 1–3 | ASM Chambourcy (10) |
| 78. | FC Val de Bièvre (11) | 2–3 | SS Voltaire Châtenay-Malabry (10) |
| 79. | Val de France Foot (9) | 1–1 (5–3 p) | ÉFC Bobigny (10) |
| 80. | RC Gonesse (10) | 2–0 | US Quincy-Voisins FC (10) |
| 81. | JSC Pitray-Olier (10) | 1–2 | AAS Fresnes (10) |
| 82. | FC Wissous (10) | 1–3 | US Villeneuve Ablon (9) |
| 83. | CS Cellois (12) | 2–1 | AS Courdimanche (11) |
| 84. | Nicolaïte Chaillot Paris (9) | 0–3 | USO Bezons (10) |
| 85. | AS Meudon (9) | 3–4 | OSC Élancourt (10) |
| 86. | Étoiles d'Auber (12) | 2–5 | FC Puiseux-Louvres (12) |
| 87. | Coulommiers Brie (11) | 3–0 | JA Paris (12) |
| 88. | US Mauloise (11) | 0–2 | Saint-Michel FC 91 (10) |
| 89. | Génération Taktik Sports (12) | 3–4 | Portugais Pontault-Combault (10) |
| 90. | Draveil FC (10) | 1–2 | Saint-Thibault-des-Vignes FC (9) |
| 91. | Brie FC (11) | 1–2 | UF Clichois (9) |
| 92. | Olympique Viarmes Asnières-sur-Oise (10) | 2–2 (3–4 p) | SFC Bailly Noisy-le-Roi (9) |
| 93. | FC Cosmo 77 (11) | 3–1 | Portugais Académica Champigny (12) |
| 94. | Vaux-le-Pénil La Rochette FC (11) | 1–11 | CO Savigny (9) |
| 95. | US Croissy (13) | 1–6 | USA Clichy (9) |
| 96. | UF Pommeuse-Faremoutiers-Dammartin-sur-Tigeaux (12) | 0–5 | Espérance Paris 19ème (9) |
| 97. | Enfants de la Goutte d'Or (9) | 2–2 (2–4 p) | Paris IFA (10) |
| 98. | ASS Noiséenne (10) | 3–0 | FC Émerainville (11) |
| 99. | AJ Antony (11) | 4–2 | Guyane FC Paris (11) |
| 100. | AGS Essarts-le-Roi (12) | 0–1 | Garches Vaucresson FC (13) |
| 101. | CSM Eaubonne (11) | 0–6 | US Carrières-sur-Seine (11) |
| 102. | JS Bondy (11) | 1–5 | CSA Kremlin-Bicêtre (10) |
| 103. | Bondoufle AC (11) | 1–4 | ASC Réunionnais de Sénart (12) |
| 104. | FC Épinay Athletico (11) | 3–0 | Les Petits Pains (12) |
| 105. | FC Lissois (10) | 0–7 | Sèvres FC 92 (9) |
| 106. | Fontenay-en-Parisis FC (11) | 1–2 | USM Gagny (10) |
| 107. | Neuilly-Plaisance FC (11) | 6–2 | CO Othis (10) |
| 108. | AS Mesnil-le-Roi (12) | 2–2 (1–4 p) | ÉS Paris (12) |
| 109. | OC Gif Section Foot (11) | 3–8 | Saint-Cloud FC (9) |
| 110. | AS Vexin (12) | 0–2 | AS Fourqueux (12) |
| 111. | AC Le Raincy (12) | 0–5 | Pays Créçois FC (9) |
| 112. | CS Achères (13) | 3–4 | Goutte d'Or FC (12) |
| 113. | FC Coudraysien (13) | 0–1 | FC Chaville (10) |
| 114. | US Roissy-en-Brie (10) | 1–2 | Racing Club 18ème (11) |
| 115. | SO Rosny-sous-Bois (11) | 2–0 | La Camillienne Sports 12ème (9) |
| 116. | CS Ternes Paris-Ouest (12) | 1–4 | RCP Fontainebleau (9) |
| 117. | USO Athis-Mons (13) | 1–1 (5–4 p) | FC Bois-le-Roi (11) |
| 118. | FC Andrésy (11) | 3–0 | Tropical AC (12) |
| 119. | FC Gournay (12) | 1–3 | UMS Pontault-Combault (9) |
| 120. | AS Montigny-le-Bretonneux (10) | 5–2 | CS Mennecy (10) |
| 121. | US Chanteloup-les-Vignes (10) | 2–2 (3–1 p) | Paris Alésia FC (9) |
| 122. | ES Frettoise (12) | 1–3 | USC Mantes (12) |
| 123. | US Marly-le-Roi (9) | 2–0 | Championnet Sports Paris (10) |
| 124. | CS Dammartin (11) | 2–4 | FC Coubronnais (10) |
| 125. | ES Guyancourt (10) | 4–3 | JS Pontoisienne (11) |
| 126. | USM Bruyères-Bernes (12) | 1–2 | ES Vauxoise (12) |
| 127. | AFC Saint-Cyr (13) | 0–1 | ES Plateau de Saclay (13) |
| 128. | US Saclas-Méréville (12) | 4–0 | FC Guignes (12) |
| 129. | ES Brie Nord (11) | 1–6 | Atletico Bagnolet (10) |
| 130. | Milly Gâtinais FC (11) | 3–2 | AJ Limeil-Brévannes (9) |
| 131. | Vinsky FC (12) | 6–2 | Antony Football Evolution (13) |
| 132. | FC Brunoy (10) | 3–3 (4–5 p) | FC Rambouillet Yvelines (10) |
| 133. | Courtry Foot (12) | 7–4 | ES Villabé (11) |
| 134. | Marles AC (12) | 1–3 | US Ormesson-sur-Marne (10) |
| 135. | Enfants de Passy Paris (10) | 0–3 | SO Houilles (9) |
| 136. | FC Saint-Germain-en-Laye (11) | 1–4 | FC Massy 91 (9) |
| 137. | FC Saint Vrain (11) | 3–1 | FC Saint-Mande (10) |
| 138. | USD Ferrières-en-Brie (11) | 5–2 | AS Grenelle (12) |
| 139. | FC Mormant (10) | 2–5 | Évry FC (9) |
| 140. | AS Saint-Mard (11) | 0–3 | FC Antillais Paris 19ème (12) |
| 141. | FC Maurecourt (12) | 1–0 | ASC Parisii (12) |
| 142. | AS Bon Conseil (12) | 0–5 (Note: AS Bon Conseil penalised for fielding an unregistered player, US Montsoult-Baillet-Maffliers qualify.) | US Montsoult-Baillet-Maffliers (11) |
| 143. | Entente Bagneaux Nemours Saint-Pierre (10) | 2–3 | UF Créteil (10) |
| 144. | US Villecresnes (11) | 2–2 (3–4 p) | FC Étampes (9) |
| 145. | AS Éragny FC (10) | 1–2 | ALJ Limay (9) |
| 146. | Thorigny FC (11) | 1–0 | OC Ivry (12) |
| 147. | FCO Vigneux (11) | 1–1 (3–1 p) | Olympique Neuilly (9) |
| 148. | Magny-le-Hongre FC (10) | 1–2 | Paris SC (9) |
| 149. | US Ris-Orangis (10) | 3–1 | US Lognes (9) |
| 150. | US Yvelines (13) | 0–3 | FC Trois Vallées (12) |
| 151. | US Verneuil-sur-Seine (10) | 3–0 | AS Soisy-sur-Seine (10) |
| 152. | Soisy-Andilly-Margency FC (10) | 5–1 | FO Plaisirois (10) |
| 153. | ES Vallée-du-Sausseron (12) | 0–6 | Gargenville Stade (10) |
| 154. | AS Horizon Aventure (13) | 0–3 | FC Varennes 77 (11) |
| 155. | AS Le Pin-Villevaude (10) | 5–1 | FC Montmorency (11) |
| 156. | AS Paris (10) | 2–1 (Note: AS Paris penalised for fielding too many transferred players, ES Vitry qualify.) | ES Vitry (9) |
| 157. | CPS Provinois (10) | 4–0 | Marolles FC (10) |
| 158. | Grigny FC (11) | 1–4 | AS Bois d'Arcy (10) |
| 159. | Viking Club de Paris (11) | 2–3 | FC Orsay-Bures (9) |
| 160. | AC Gentilly (10) | 1–2 | FC Servon (10) |
| 161. | Entente Santeny Périgny Mandres (12) | 3–3 (3–0 p) | FC Villiers-Saint-Georges (12) |
| 162. | Alliance 77 Évry-Grégy-Solers (11) | 1–4 | Vers l'Avant (11) |
| 163. | SC Briard (10) | 3–5 | AS Itteville (10) |
| 164. | GAFE Plessis-Bouchard (11) | 1–0 | Champs FC (11) |
| 165. | AS Drancy Espoir (12) | 1–3 | AJSC Nanterre (10) |
| 166. | FC Solitaires Paris Est (9) | 3–3 (2–4 p) | ES Montreuil (10) |
| 167. | Marcouville City Cergy-Pontoise (12) | – (Note: The original tie at the home of Marcouville City Cergy-Pontoise was not played, as the pitch was occupied at the scheduled kickoff time, despite having been reserved for the tie. The league ruled that the match be rescheduled for 31 May 2023, and reversed so that FC Région Houdanaise were the home team.) | FC Région Houdanaise (11) |
| 168. | CS Villetaneuse (10) | 2–3 | CSM Rosny-sur-Seine (11) |
| 169. | CF Isles-lès-Villenoy (12) | 0–3 | AS La Plaine Victoire (12) |
| 170. | Boissy UJ (12) | 0–3 | US Avonnaise (9) |
| 171. | FC Portugais US Ris-Orangis (11) | 2–1 | FC Moret-Veneux Sablons (10) |
| 172. | Entente Méry-Mériel Bessancourt (10) | 3–0 | Panamicaine FC (11) |
| 173. | Osny FC (9) | 0–0 | US Le Pecq (10) |
| 174. | SC Dugny (10) | 3–0 | Bann'Zanmi (11) |
| 175. | ES Montgeron (12) | 3–1 | ASC Velizy (11) |
| 176. | CS Pouchet Paris XVII (11) | 3–0 | ESM Thillay-Vaudherland (11) |
| 177. | Flamboyants Villepinte (9) | 1–3 | LSO Colombes (10) |
| 178. | Pierrefitte FC (10) | 1–1 (3–4 p) (Note: The original tie at the home of AF Paris 18 was not played after the referee ruled the pitch unplayable. The league ruled that the match be rescheduled for 31 May 2023, and reversed so that Pierrefitte FC were the home team.) | AF Paris 18 (11) |
| 179. | ÉS Sourds de Vitry (12) | 0–6 | FC Dammarie-lès-Lys (11) |
| 180. | CO Cachan (10) | 2–1 | Drancy FC (11) |
| 181. | Morsang-sur-Orge FC (10) | 1–3 | Savigny-le-Temple FC (10) |
| 182. | Sevran FC (10) | 3–0 | AS Fontenay-Trésigny (11) |
| 183. | AJ Mézières (12) | 1–6 | FC Écouen (9) |

=== Second round ===
These matches were played between 8 and 18 June 2023, with two replayed on 27 August 2023. Tiers relate to the 2022–23 season.

Second Round Results: Paris-Île-de-France
| Tie no | Home team (Tier) | Score | Away team (Tier) |
|---|---|---|---|
| 1. | ES Marly-la-Ville (9) | 2–1 (Note: The match was originally played on 8 June 2023, and ended 6–5. OFC Couronnes lodged an appeal before the match to state that the floodlights were not formally approved for a night match in the Coupe de France. The Commission des Statuts et Règlements initially ruled against OFC Couronnes, on the word of the referee that the lighting was sufficient. OFC Couronnes appealed, and the Comité d’Appel chargé des Affaires Courantes ruled that the game should be replayed at a future date. It was eventually replayed on 27 August 2023.) | OFC Couronnes (10) |
| 2. | AS Bucheloise (10) | 1–6 | AS Saint-Ouen-l'Aumône (6) |
| 3. | AAS Fresnes (10) | 1–4 | Saint-Denis US (6) |
| 4. | FC Orsay-Bures (9) | 3–2 | US Marly-le-Roi (9) |
| 5. | FC Rambouillet Yvelines (10) | 1–4 | FC Massy 91 (9) |
| 6. | Sèvres FC 92 (9) | 3–3 (4–2 p) | FC Mantois 78 (6) |
| 7. | AF Garenne-Colombes (7) | 0–2 | CS Meaux (6) |
| 8. | FC Longjumeau (10) | 0–0 (5–6 p) | Conflans FC (7) |
| 9. | AS Chelles (8) | 2–1 | Cosmo Taverny (7) |
| 10. | FC Villiers-le-Bel (9) | 1–2 | Neauphle-le-Château-Pontchartrain RC 78 (7) |
| 11. | Val d'Europe FC (8) | 1–4 | Montreuil FC (7) |
| 12. | AS Sud Essonne (11) | 1–3 | Élan Chevilly-Larue (9) |
| 13. | FCM Vauréal (10) | 1–1 (5–6 p) | CSL Aulnay (8) |
| 14. | US Montsoult-Baillet-Maffliers (11) | 3–8 | Claye-Souilly SF (6) |
| 15. | AS Bois d'Arcy (10) | 2–3 | AC Paris 15 (7) |
| 16. | CSA Kremlin-Bicêtre (10) | 4–3 | AF Paris 18 (11) |
| 17. | RC Gonesse (10) | 6–2 | AS Cheminots Ouest (11) |
| 18. | FC Maurecourt (12) | 2–3 | FC Issy-les-Moulineaux (8) |
| 19. | USA Feucherolles (13) | 1–0 | US Ris-Orangis (10) |
| 20. | FC Bourget (9) | 5–1 | Thorigny FC (11) |
| 21. | FC Chaville (10) | 1–3 | ES Trappes (7) |
| 22. | USM Gagny (10) | 2–2 (3–4 p) | Coulommiers Brie (11) |
| 23. | Association Zenaga de Figuig (12) | 3–3 (6–7 p) | US Avonnaise (9) |
| 24. | Aigle Fertoise Boissy le Cutté (11) | 1–3 | US Sénart-Moissy (6) |
| 25. | Garches Vaucresson FC (13) | 5–7 | Vinsky FC (12) |
| 26. | Salésienne de Paris (8) | 6–0 | FC Franconville (7) |
| 27. | FC Antillais Paris 19ème (12) | 0–5 | ASC La Courneuve (8) |
| 28. | Soisy-Andilly-Margency FC (10) | 1–1 (3–4 p) | Tremblay FC (7) |
| 29. | FC Servon (10) | 5–0 | ES Caudacienne (11) |
| 30. | UMS Pontault-Combault (9) | 0–3 | Argenteuil FC (8) |
| 31. | FC Le Chesnay 78 (9) | 2–2 (1–4 p) | FC Courcouronnes (8) |
| 32. | Stade de l'Est Pavillonnais (8) | 2–5 | FCM Garges-lès-Gonesse (8) |
| 33. | Évry FC (9) | 5–2 | US Chanteloup-les-Vignes (10) |
| 34. | Stade de Vanves (9) | 2–4 | RFC Argenteuil (7) |
| 35. | Atletico Bagnolet (10) | 2–1 | AS Menucourt (10) |
| 36. | Dourdan Sport (10) | 6–4 | Sucy FC (7) |
| 37. | Saint-Michel FC 91 (10) | 5–4 | Sevran FC (10) |
| 38. | Bussy Saint-Georges FC (9) | 2–7 | ASS Noiséenne (10) |
| 39. | AS Fontenaisienne (13) | 6–0 | US Saclas-Méréville (12) |
| 40. | Voisins FC (9) | 2–4 | Val Yerres Crosne AF (7) |
| 41. | AJSC Nanterre (10) | 1–2 | FC Villennes-Orgeval (11) |
| 42. | AS Fontenay-Saint-Père (12) | 2–8 | Olympique Adamois (7) |
| 43. | US Villejuif (6) | 16–0 (Note: Tie reversed from original draw.) | FC Nandy (12) |
| 44. | JS Villetaneuse (10) | 4–1 | US Jouy-en-Josas (10) |
| 45. | FC Dammarie-lès-Lys (11) | 1–3 | ES Montgeron (12) |
| 46. | AS Choisy-le-Roi (7) | 3–0 | Saint-Thibault-des-Vignes FC (9) |
| 47. | CA L'Haÿ-les-Roses (10) | 1–3 | AS Le Pin-Villevaude (10) |
| 48. | AO Buc Foot (12) | 1–0 (Note: AO Buc Foot penalised for fielding a suspended players, FC Morangis-Chilly qualify.) | FC Morangis-Chilly (7) |
| 49. | SFC Bailly Noisy-le-Roi (9) | 3–1 | CO Cachan (10) |
| 50. | Espérance Aulnay (6) | 1–0 | Thiais FC (9) |
| 51. | SC Épinay-sur-Orge (11) | 4–2 | ASC Réunionnais de Sénart (12) |
| 52. | FC Trois Vallées (12) | 0–3 (Note: Tie won by means of forfeit.) | Athletic Club de Boulogne-Billancourt (7) |
| 53. | FC Romainville (11) | 3–3 (1–3 p) | CPS Provinois (10) |
| 54. | FC Vallée 78 (9) | 4–7 | CA Paris 14 (9) |
| 55. | Savigny-le-Temple FC (10) | 3–3 (1–4 p) | Milly Gâtinais FC (11) |
| 56. | US Montesson (10) | 3–4 | CSM Gennevilliers (8) |
| 57. | FC Bonnières-sur-Seine Freneuse (13) | 3–2 | Entente Méry-Mériel Bessancourt (10) |
| 58. | CSM Rosny-sur-Seine (11) | 2–2 (4–5 p) | Cergy Pontoise FC (6) |
| 59. | USD Ferrières-en-Brie (11) | 3–5 | OFC Pantin (8) |
| 60. | AAS Sarcelles (7) | 3–0 | AS Bondy (10) |
| 61. | FC Puiseux-Louvres (12) | 0–4 | ES Vitry (9) |
| 62. | Juvisy AF Essonne (12) | 1–12 | FC Livry-Gargan (7) |
| 63. | Marcoussis Nozay La-Ville-du-Bois FC (9) | 3–0 | US Verneuil-sur-Seine (10) |
| 64. | CO Savigny (9) | 4–2 | JS Suresnes (7) |
| 65. | UF Créteil (10) | 3–2 | FC Saint-Germain-Saintry-Saint-Pierre (11) |
| 66. | ASL Janville Lardy (12) | 0–9 | ASF Le Perreux (8) |
| 67. | FC Varennes 77 (11) | 2–2 (6–5 p) | FC Portugais US Ris-Orangis (11) |
| 68. | Vers l'Avant (11) | 4–4 (3–1 p) | Olympique Paris 15 (11) |
| 69. | Gargenville Stade (10) | 1–1 (5–4 p) | Courbevoie Sports (8) |
| 70. | Entente Santeny Périgny Mandres (12) | 2–1 (Note: The original game finished 1–4, but a challenge from Entente Santeny Périgny Mandres uncovered a refereeing error, and the league ordered the game to be replayed at a future date. It was eventually replayed on 27 August 2023.) | Dammarie City (11) |
| 71. | AS Itteville (10) | 0–1 | US Fontenay-sous-Bois (7) |
| 72. | USA Clichy (9) | 9–3 | ACS Cormeillais (10) |
| 73. | AS Évry-Courcouronnes (12) | 6–4 | Val de France Foot (9) |
| 74. | US Villeneuve Ablon (9) | 1–3 | FC Plessis-Robinson (6) |
| 75. | USC Mantes (12) | 2–2 (3–2 p) | USM Malakoff (10) |
| 76. | AS Ermont (8) | 2–2 (5–4 p) | SC Gretz-Tournan (7) |
| 77. | Espérance Paris 19ème (9) | 1–2 (Note: ES Villiers-sur-Marne penalised for fielding a suspended player, Espérance Paris 19ème qualify.) | ES Villiers-sur-Marne (10) |
| 78. | Maisons-Laffitte FC (12) | 0–0 (7–6 p) | USO Bezons (10) |
| 79. | Pays Créçois FC (9) | 1–2 | Noisy-le-Grand FC (6) |
| 80. | US Persan (9) | 1–3 | AC Houilles (6) |
| 81. | USO Athis-Mons (13) | 1–9 | Saint-Cloud FC (9) |
| 82. | ES Plateau de Saclay (13) | 1–3 | FC Melun (7) |
| 83. | CA Combs-la-Ville (10) | 0–5 | ES Colombienne (7) |
| 84. | ES Cesson Vert Saint-Denis (7) | 7–0 | SS Voltaire Châtenay-Malabry (10) |
| 85. | UF Clichois (9) | 2–8 | Saint-Maur VGA (7) |
| 86. | US Rungis (8) | 1–1 (2–3 p) | FC Rueil Malmaison (7) |
| 87. | CSM Clamart Foot (10) | 2–3 | Sartrouville FC (8) |
| 88. | FC Coignières (10) | 3–1 | AJ Étampoise (11) |
| 89. | FC Vaujours (11) | 3–2 | FC Épinay Athletico (11) |
| 90. | ES Vauxoise (12) | 2–3 | Magny-en-Vexin FC (12) |
| 91. | ALJ Limay (9) | 1–4 | FC Saint-Leu (6) |
| 92. | FCO Vigneux (11) | 6–1 | Neuilly-Plaisance FC (11) |
| 93. | AJ Antony (11) | 8–1 | Kingdom Sport (12) |
| 94. | AS La Plaine Victoire (12) | 8–1 | Interfoot 78 (13) |
| 95. | Amicale Villeneuve-la-Garenne (8) | 4–3 | FC Les Lilas (6) |
| 96. | AS Saint-Germain-lès-Arpajon (13) | 3–1 | ES Guyancourt (10) |
| 97. | AS Fourqueux (12) | 1–4 | AS Beauchamp (11) |
| 98. | FC Fontenay-le-Fleury (11) | 0–0 (5–4 p) | FC Saint Vrain (11) |
| 99. | US Ormesson-sur-Marne (10) | 2–3 | Olympique Noisy-le-Sec (7) |
| 100. | CS Cellois (12) | 2–2 (2–4 p) | ES Nanterre (6) |
| 101. | US Carrières-sur-Seine (11) | 0–3 | CO Vincennes (6) |
| 102. | Stade Français (12) | 8–1 | ESC Paris 20 (12) |
| 103. | ES Montreuil (10) | 1–0 | CSM Puteaux (7) |
| 104. | US Torcy (6) | 5–1 | FC Coubronnais (10) |
| 105. | CSM Bonneuil-sur-Marne (9) | 2–1 | Paris IFA (10) |
| 106. | EF Jean Mendez (12) | 3–1 | FC Auvers-Ennery (11) |
| 107. | SO Houilles (9) | 3–2 | Épinay Académie (8) |
| 108. | FC Nogent-sur-Marne (9) | 2–1 | USM Villeparisis (8) |
| 109. | FC Jouy-le-Moutier (10) | 6–1 | AS Maurepas (8) |
| 110. | Courtry Foot (12) | 0–11 | Saint-Brice FC (6) |
| 111. | OSC Élancourt (10) | 0–3 | US Grigny (7) |
| 112. | FC Goussainville (8) | 0–2 | Champigny FC 94 (7) |
| 113. | LSO Colombes (10) | 0–2 | Mitry-Mory (7) |
| 114. | SC Dugny (10) | 1–1 (7–6 p) | UJA Maccabi Paris Métropole (8) |
| 115. | US Hardricourt (8) | 2–2 (4–3 p) | Osny FC (9) |
| 116. | Racing Club 18ème (11) | 10–1 | GAFE Plessis-Bouchard (11) |
| 117. | JA Montrouge (12) | 4–9 | FC Région Houdanaise (11) |
| 118. | COM Bagneux (8) | 0–0 (5–4 p) | US Palaiseau (7) |
| 119. | CS Pouchet Paris XVII (11) | 0–5 | AS Chatou (6) |
| 120. | Paray FC (8) | 4–1 | FC Ozoir-la-Ferrière 77 (7) |
| 121. | CSM Île-Saint-Denis (11) | 3–3 (4–2 p) | Goutte d'Or FC (12) |
| 122. | ÉS Paris (12) | 1–10 | FC Cosmo 77 (11) |
| 123. | CA Paris-Charenton (8) | 2–2 (15–14 p) | Villemomble Sports (7) |
| 124. | Portugais Pontault-Combault (10) | 0–3 | FC Maisons Alfort (8) |
| 125. | ASM Chambourcy (10) | 2–1 | SO Rosny-sous-Bois (11) |
| 126. | FC Écouen (9) | 3–1 | ES Parisienne (7) |
| 127. | FC Étampes (9) | 2–0 | ASA Issy (7) |
| 128. | US Ponthierry (11) | 0–10 | FC Igny (7) |
| 129. | RCP Fontainebleau (9) | 3–3 (4–5 p) | ES Viry-Châtillon (6) |
| 130. | US Vaires-sur-Marne (8) | 1–2 | Paris Université Club (9) |
| 131. | Neuilly-Plaisance Sports (11) | 3–5 | ES Petit Anges Paris (11) |
| 132. | FC Groslay (9) | 0–2 | ES Stains (8) |
| 133. | SFC Champagne 95 (9) | 2–2 (4–5 p) | Paris SC (9) |
| 134. | ES Herblay (12) | 3–0 | Villeneuve AFC (11) |
| 135. | FC Villepinte (10) | 5–1 (Note: FC Villepinte penalised for fielding a player without a valid medical certificate, FC Andrésy qualify.) | FC Andrésy (11) |
| 136. | AS Montigny-le-Bretonneux (10) | 2–5 | FC Montfermeil (8) |

=== Third round ===
These matches were played on 16 and 17 September 2023.

Third Round Results: Paris-Île-de-France
| Tie no | Home team (Tier) | Score | Away team (Tier) |
|---|---|---|---|
| 1. | AC Houilles (6) | 3–1 | FC Rueil Malmaison (7) |
| 2. | Dourdan Sport (10) | 1–6 | ES Trappes (7) |
| 3. | AS Le Pin-Villevaude (10) | 0–3 | Blanc-Mesnil SF (5) |
| 4. | CSM Île-Saint-Denis (11) | 1–3 | Gargenville Stade (10) |
| 5. | FC Igny (7) | 0–0 (6–5 p) | OFC Les Mureaux (5) |
| 6. | Atletico Bagnolet (9) | 0–1 | CA Paris-Charenton (7) |
| 7. | CSM Bonneuil-sur-Marne (9) | 2–3 | Saint-Denis US (6) |
| 8. | Entente Santeny Périgny Mandres (12) | 1–5 | FC Plessis-Robinson (6) |
| 9. | Élan Chevilly-Larue (9) | 2–0 | Tremblay FC (7) |
| 10. | Paris Université Club (9) | 1–0 | ES Colombienne (7) |
| 11. | AS Évry-Courcouronnes (11) | 1–1 (3–0 p) | SFC Bailly Noisy-le-Roi (9) |
| 12. | Conflans FC (7) | 1–1 (2–3 p) | FC Maisons Alfort (8) |
| 13. | Racing Club 18ème (11) | 0–0 (4–1 p) | ES Montreuil (10) |
| 14. | Maisons-Laffitte FC (11) | 1–1 (3–2 p) | ES Petit Anges Paris (12) |
| 15. | FCO Vigneux (11) | 1–3 | ES Nanterre (6) |
| 16. | AS Chelles (8) | 0–2 | AAS Sarcelles (7) |
| 17. | Magny-en-Vexin FC (11) | 0–3 | ASC La Courneuve (8) |
| 18. | ES Montgeron (11) | 0–5 | Le Mée Sports (6) |
| 19. | ES Herblay (11) | 2–1 | FC Montfermeil (7) |
| 20. | FC Jouy-le-Moutier (9) | 0–3 | Neauphle-le-Château-Pontchartrain RC 78 (7) |
| 21. | ASM Chambourcy (10) | 2–5 | Évry FC (9) |
| 22. | AS Choisy-le-Roi (7) | 3–1 | CS Meaux (6) |
| 23. | AS Beauchamp (12) | 1–8 | SO Houilles (9) |
| 24. | ASS Noiséenne (10) | 4–3 | ES Marly-la-Ville (9) |
| 25. | Saint-Cloud FC (8) | 2–1 | US Hardricourt (7) |
| 26. | AJ Antony (12) | 2–4 | FC Courcouronnes (8) |
| 27. | US Avonnaise (9) | 0–5 | CS Brétigny (5) |
| 28. | Stade Français (none) | 0–3 (Note: Tie won by means of forfeit.) | ES Viry-Châtillon (7) |
| 29. | RC Gonesse (10) | 2–1 (Note: RC Gonesse penalised for fielding a suspended player, US Torcy qualify.) | US Torcy (6) |
| 30. | FC Villennes-Orgeval (11) | 3–2 | RFC Argenteuil (7) |
| 31. | FC Varennes 77 (11) | 1–6 | CO Savigny (9) |
| 32. | FC Étampes (10) | 1–3 | FC Servon (9) |
| 33. | CSA Kremlin-Bicêtre (10) | 0–6 | Val Yerres Crosne AF (6) |
| 34. | AS Saint-Germain-lès-Arpajon (12) | 8–1 | EF Jean Mendez (13) |
| 35. | AC Créteil (10) | 1–0 | Paris SC (10) |
| 36. | FC Livry-Gargan (7) | 0–0 (3–4 p) | Sainte-Geneviève Sports (5) |
| 37. | FC Fontenay-le-Fleury (11) | 1–8 | Cergy Pontoise FC (6) |
| 38. | FC Coignières (10) | 0–3 | FC Massy 91 (8) |
| 39. | ES Stains (8) | 2–2 (3–2 p) | CA Vitry (5) |
| 40. | Vinsky FC (11) | 1–7 | AC Paris 15 (7) |
| 41. | SC Dugny (10) | 0–3 | Claye-Souilly SF (6) |
| 42. | FC Saint-Leu (7) | 0–2 | US Villejuif (6) |
| 43. | CPS Provinois (11) | 5–4 | AS La Plaine Victoire (12) |
| 44. | USC Mantes (12) | 0–4 | AS Ermont (8) |
| 45. | JS Villetaneuse (10) | 0–9 | Olympique Adamois (7) |
| 46. | FC Andrésy (11) | 1–7 (Note: FCM Garges-lès-Gonesse penalised or fielding an ineligible player, FC Andrésy qualify.) | FCM Garges-lès-Gonesse (8) |
| 47. | Mitry Compans Goelly (7) | 1–1 (5–4 p) | US Ivry (5) |
| 48. | FC Morangis-Chilly (7) | 2–1 | FC Issy-les-Moulineaux (8) |
| 49. | Sèvres FC 92 (9) | 0–1 | Olympique Noisy-le-Sec (7) |
| 50. | FC Bonnières-sur-Seine Freneuse (13) | 1–4 | Athletic Club de Boulogne-Billancourt (7) |
| 51. | US Fontenay-sous-Bois (8) | 1–1 (5–4 p) | Noisy-le-Grand FC (7) |
| 52. | US Grigny (7) | 0–3 | US Sénart-Moissy (6) |
| 53. | ASF Le Perreux (7) | 0–0 (4–1 p) | CO Les Ulis (6) |
| 54. | FC Écouen (9) | 4–0 | OFC Pantin (8) |
| 55. | Milly Gâtinais FC (11) | 0–2 | Saint-Maur VGA (7) |
| 56. | FC Bourget (9) | 0–5 | AS Saint-Ouen-l'Aumône (5) |
| 57. | FC Vaujours (11) | 0–4 | CO Vincennes (7) |
| 58. | FC Région Houdanaise (10) | 1–5 | Montrouge FC 92 (5) |
| 59. | USA Clichy (9) | 1–4 | Espérance Aulnay (6) |
| 60. | Vers l'Avant (10) | 0–14 | JA Drancy (5) |
| 61. | CSL Aulnay (7) | 1–1 (3–5 p) | Entente SSG (5) |
| 62. | SC Épinay-sur-Orge (11) | 1–4 | CSM Gennevilliers (8) |
| 63. | Saint-Michel FC 91 (9) | 2–1 | Espérance Paris 19ème (9) |
| 64. | Coulommiers Brie (10) | 1–1 (5–6 p) | Champigny FC 94 (7) |
| 65. | Marcoussis Nozay La-Ville-du-Bois FC (9) | 2–6 | US Lusitanos Saint-Maur (5) |
| 66. | Salésienne de Paris (8) | 1–3 | Saint-Brice FC (6) |
| 67. | COM Bagneux (8) | 0–4 | ESA Linas-Montlhéry (5) |
| 68. | Paray FC (8) | 4–2 | FC Melun (7) |
| 69. | ES Vitry (9) | 1–2 | Sartrouville FC (7) |
| 70. | Amicale Villeneuve-la-Garenne (8) | 1–1 (7–8 p) | AS Chatou (5) |

=== Fourth round ===
These matches were played on 30 September and 1 October 2023.

Fourth Round Results: Paris-Île-de-France
| Tie no | Home team (Tier) | Score | Away team (Tier) |
|---|---|---|---|
| 1. | US Lusitanos Saint-Maur (5) | 0–3 | JA Drancy (5) |
| 2. | ES Nanterre (6) | 1–2 | Sainte-Geneviève Sports (5) |
| 3. | AS Ermont (8) | 2–0 | FC Servon (9) |
| 4. | FC Maisons Alfort (8) | 2–4 | US Créteil-Lusitanos (4) |
| 5. | Saint-Michel FC 91 (9) | 3–2 | AAS Sarcelles (7) |
| 6. | AS Saint-Germain-lès-Arpajon (12) | 1–4 | FC Écouen (9) |
| 7. | SO Houilles (9) | 0–0 (9–8 p) | Évry FC (9) |
| 8. | FC Cosmo 77 (10) | 0–7 | FC Fleury 91 (4) |
| 9. | Saint-Brice FC (6) | 1–1 (4–2 p) | US Sénart-Moissy (6) |
| 10. | ASF Le Perreux (7) | 1–3 | ESA Linas-Montlhéry (5) |
| 11. | Athletic Club de Boulogne-Billancourt (7) | 1–2 | CSM Gennevilliers (8) |
| 12. | ES Viry-Châtillon (7) | 3–1 | ES Cesson Vert Saint-Denis (8) |
| 13. | Gargenville Stade (10) | 0–1 | US Villejuif (6) |
| 14. | FC Villennes-Orgeval (11) | 1–1 (6–5 p) | AS Choisy-le-Roi (7) |
| 15. | Val Yerres Crosne AF (6) | 0–2 | FCM Aubervilliers (4) |
| 16. | AS Évry-Courcouronnes (11) | 3–1 | CPS Provinois (11) |
| 17. | ES Herblay (11) | 1–0 | Paris Université Club (9) |
| 18. | ES Trappes (7) | 0–3 | Racing Club de France Football (4) |
| 19. | Olympique Adamois (7) | 1–0 | Champigny FC 94 (7) |
| 20. | FC Andrésy (11) | 1–10 | AS Chatou (5) |
| 21. | FC Orsay-Bures (9) | 1–3 | ASC La Courneuve (8) |
| 22. | Saint-Maur VGA (7) | 0–1 | FC Igny (7) |
| 23. | AC Créteil (10) | 0–2 | Saint-Cloud FC (8) |
| 24. | Mitry Compans Goelly (7) | 0–4 | Paris 13 Atletico (4) |
| 25. | USA Feucherolles (12) | 0–4 | FC Plessis-Robinson (6) |
| 26. | AS Fontenaisienne (12) | 0–1 | FC Morangis-Chilly (7) |
| 27. | AC Paris 15 (7) | 0–5 | Saint-Denis US (6) |
| 28. | Le Mée Sports (6) | 2–5 | Blanc-Mesnil SF (6) |
| 29. | Maisons-Laffitte FC (11) | 2–5 | ASS Noiséenne (10) |
| 30. | CS Brétigny (5) | 0–1 | Montrouge FC 92 (5) |
| 31. | US Fontenay-sous-Bois (8) | 0–1 | Argenteuil FC (7) |
| 32. | Claye-Souilly SF (6) | 0–0 (1–4 p) | Neauphle-le-Château-Pontchartrain RC 78 (7) |
| 33. | ES Stains (8) | 0–3 | Cergy Pontoise FC (6) |
| 34. | FC Courcouronnes (8) | 0–4 | AC Houilles (6) |
| 35. | Montreuil FC (7) | 1–2 | FC Massy 91 (8) |
| 36. | Élan Chevilly-Larue (9) | 3–0 | CO Vincennes (7) |
| 37. | CA Paris-Charenton (7) | 4–0 | Paray FC (8) |
| 38. | Racing Club 18ème (11) | 0–9 | US Torcy (6) |
| 39. | Sartrouville FC (7) | 1–2 | AS Saint-Ouen-l'Aumône (5) |
| 40. | FC Nogent-sur-Marne (9) | 0–2 | Olympique Noisy-le-Sec (7) |
| 41. | CO Savigny (9) | 1–2 | Entente SSG (5) |
| 42. | CA Paris 14 (9) | 0–1 | Espérance Aulnay (6) |

=== Fifth round ===
These matches were played on 14 and 15 October 2023.

Fifth Round Results: Paris-Île-de-France
| Tie no | Home team (Tier) | Score | Away team (Tier) |
|---|---|---|---|
| 1. | Olympique Adamois (7) | 0–4 | US Créteil-Lusitanos (4) |
| 2. | ES Viry-Châtillon (7) | 1–1 (4–2 p) | AS Saint-Ouen-l'Aumône (5) |
| 3. | Élan Chevilly-Larue (9) | 2–2 (3–4 p) | Saint-Denis US (6) |
| 4. | CA Paris-Charenton (7) | 1–2 | FC Fleury 91 (4) |
| 5. | ASS Noiséenne (10) | 1–1 (2–4 p) | AS Chatou (5) |
| 6. | AC Houilles (6) | 2–1 | ESA Linas-Montlhéry (5) |
| 7. | FC Villennes-Orgeval (11) | 0–3 | Espérance Aulnay (6) |
| 8. | SO Houilles (9) | 1–1 (0–3 p) | FCM Aubervilliers (4) |
| 9. | Saint-Cloud FC (8) | 0–3 | FC Versailles 78 (3) |
| 10. | FC Écouen (9) | 2–0 | ASC La Courneuve (8) |
| 11. | Neauphle-le-Château-Pontchartrain RC 78 (7) | 1–5 | Red Star FC (3) |
| 12. | FC Massy 91 (8) | 6–1 | AS Ermont (8) |
| 13. | JA Drancy (5) | 1–3 | US Villejuif (6) |
| 14. | Saint-Michel FC 91 (9) | 2–1 | FC Igny (7) |
| 15. | Blanc-Mesnil SF (6) | 1–1 (4–3 p) | Montrouge FC 92 (5) |
| 16. | ES Herblay (11) | 0–2 | FC Plessis-Robinson (6) |
| 17. | AS Évry-Courcouronnes (11) | 3–4 | US Torcy (6) |
| 18. | CSM Gennevilliers (8) | 1–3 | Entente SSG (5) |
| 19. | Olympique Noisy-le-Sec (7) | 1–0 | Cergy Pontoise FC (6) |
| 20. | Saint-Brice FC (6) | 2–1 | Paris 13 Atletico (4) |
| 21. | Sainte-Geneviève Sports (5) | 1–5 | Racing Club de France Football (4) |
| 22. | FC Morangis-Chilly (7) | 5–0 | Argenteuil FC (7) |

=== Sixth round ===
These matches were played on 28 and 29 October 2023.

Sixth Round Results: Paris-Île-de-France
| Tie no | Home team (Tier) | Score | Away team (Tier) |
|---|---|---|---|
| 1. | Olympique Noisy-le-Sec (7) | 1–1 (5–4 p) | US Créteil-Lusitanos (4) |
| 2. | FC Versailles 78 (3) | 1–1 (4–5 p) | FC Fleury 91 (4) |
| 3. | Saint-Michel FC 91 (9) | 3–0 | FC Massy 91 (8) |
| 4. | Blanc-Mesnil SF (6) | 0–1 | Racing Club de France Football (4) |
| 5. | FC Plessis-Robinson (6) | 3–3 (4–1 p) | Saint-Brice FC (6) |
| 6. | Saint-Denis US (6) | 5–2 | ES Viry-Châtillon (7) |
| 7. | Entente SSG (5) | 0–0 (3–0 p) | FCM Aubervilliers (4) |
| 8. | US Torcy (6) | 2–0 | AS Chatou (5) |
| 9. | Espérance Aulnay (6) | 1–3 | Red Star FC (3) |
| 10. | FC Écouen (9) | 0–1 | AC Houilles (6) |
| 11. | US Villejuif (6) | 2–2 (10–9 p) | FC Morangis-Chilly (7) |
