= CPFC (disambiguation) =

CPFC most often refers to English football club Crystal Palace F.C. It may also refer to:

- Cergy Pontoise FC, also known as CPFC, a French football club
- Crystal Palace Baltimore, also known as CPFC Baltimore, an American soccer club
