= Alexis Vossah =

French footballer (born 2008)

Personal information
- Date of birth: 11 March 2008 (age 18)
- Place of birth: Alfortville, France
- Height: 1.81 m (5 ft 11 in)
- Position: Midfielder

Team information
- Current team: Toulouse
- Number: 6

Youth career
- 2015–2022: Cergy Pontoise
- 2022–2025: Toulouse

Senior career*
Years	Team	Apps	(Gls)
2025–	Toulouse II	4	(0)
2025–	Toulouse	23	(1)

International career^{‡}
2023	France U16	5	(0)
2025–	France U18	3	(0)
- * Club domestic league appearances and goals as of 19 May 2026 ‡ National team caps and goals as of 23:49, 7 September 2025 (UTC)

Alexis Vossah (born 11 March 2008) is a French professional footballer who plays as a midfielder for Ligue 1 club Toulouse.

== Club career ==
Vossah is a product of the youth academies of Cergy Pontoise and Toulouse. On 16 August 2025, he made his senior and professional debut with Toulouse in a 1–0 win over OGC Nice.

== International career ==
Born in France, Vossah is of Togolese descent. In September 2023, he was called up to the France U16s for a set of friendlies.

== Playing style ==
Vossah is capable of playing as central midfielder, defensive midfielder, or as a centre-back. He has been noted for his passing ability, physical strength, and capacity to retain possession under pressure, while also being regularly involved in his team's build-up play.
