= Nsana Simon =

French footballer (born 2000)

Personal information
- Full name: Nsana Claudélion Etienne Simon
- Date of birth: 11 March 2000 (age 26)
- Place of birth: Saint-Denis, France
- Height: 1.71 m (5 ft 7 in)
- Position: Midfielder

Team information
- Current team: Sumgayit
- Number: 95

Youth career
- 2006–2013: Cergy Pontoise
- 2013–2017: Lens

Senior career*
Years	Team	Apps	(Gls)
2017–2020	Lens II	59	(4)
2021	St. Gallen	2	(0)
2021–2023	Bravo	58	(3)
2023–2025	Sakaryaspor	47	(1)
2025–	Sumgayit	20	(3)

International career
2018	France U18	3	(0)
- * Club domestic league appearances and goals as of 22 June 2026

Nsana Claudélion Etienne Simon (born 11 March 2000) is footballer who plays as a midfielder for Azerbaijan Premier League club Sumgayit. Born in France, he plays for the Congo national team.

== Club career ==
On 30 March 2018, Simon signed his first professional contract with RC Lens. On 30 January 2021, Simon signed with St. Gallen in the Swiss Super League. He made his debut with St. Gallen in a 4–3 Swiss Super League loss to FC Lausanne-Sport on 20 March 2021.

Simon joined Slovenian club Bravo on 22 July 2021.

Simon joined Turkish club Sakaryaspor on 25 August 2023.
