= Sékou Baradji (footballer, born 1995) =

French footballer

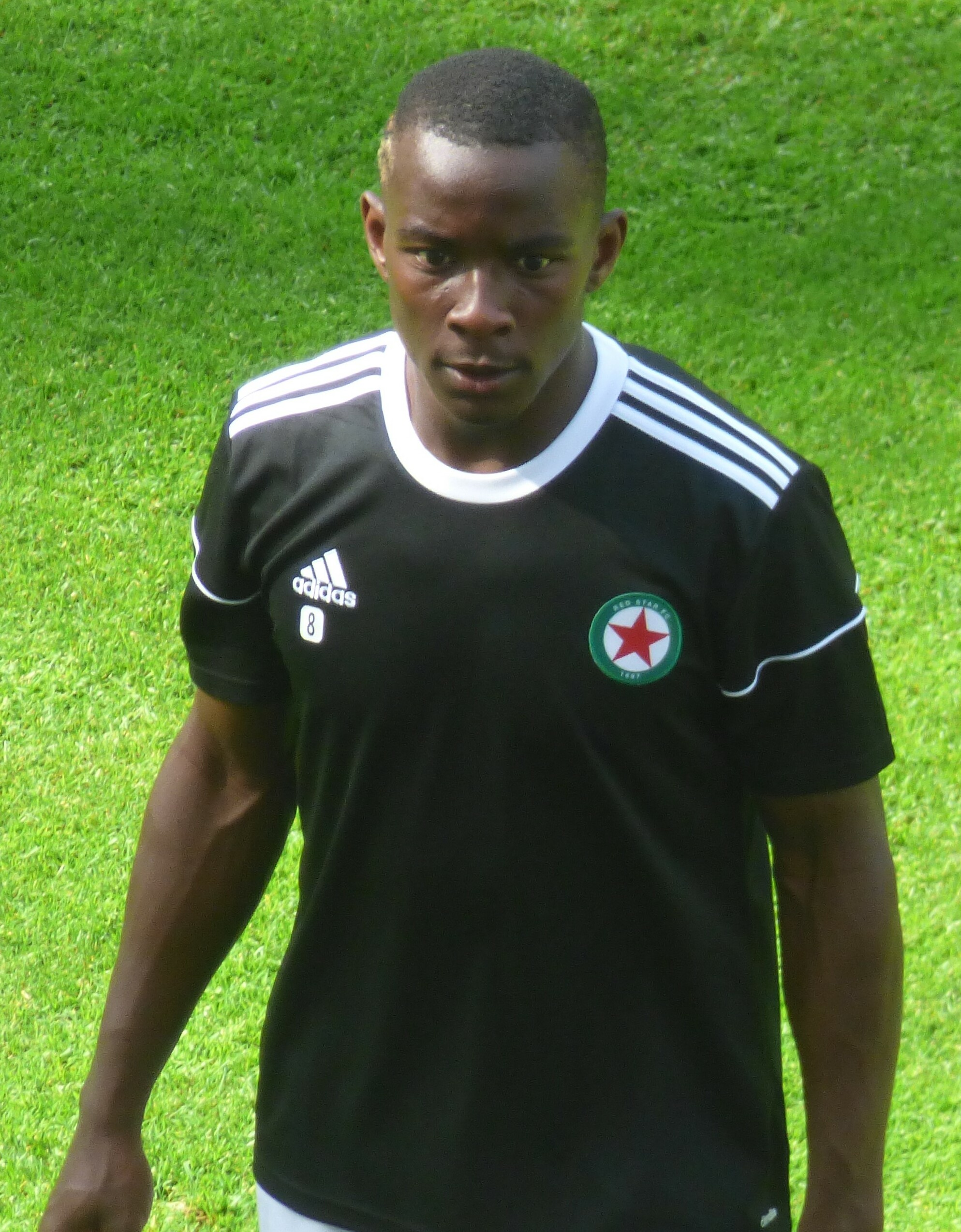
- Baradji in 2018

Personal information
- Date of birth: 30 August 1995 (age 31)
- Place of birth: Cergy, France
- Height: 1.74 m (5 ft 9 in)
- Position: Forward

Team information
- Current team: Grasse

Youth career
- 2003–2012: Cergy Pontoise (Note: In 2005, US Cergy Clos merged with Olympique de Cergy-Pontoise to form Cergy Pontoise FC.)
- 2012: Elche
- 2013: L'Entente SSG
- 2013: Racing CFF

Senior career*
Years	Team	Apps	(Gls)
2014–2015	Olympique Montigny		
2015–2016	OFC Les Mureaux		
2016–2017	Boulogne-Billancourt	24	(9)
2017–2020	Red Star	37	(4)
2019	→ Bourg-Péronnas (loan)	11	(0)
2020–	Grasse	4	(0)
- * Club domestic league appearances and goals as of 11:39, 21 July 2020 (UTC)

Sékou Baradji (born 30 August 1995) is a French professional footballer who plays as a forward for RC Grasse.

== Early life ==
Baradji was born in Cergy, in the northwestern suburbs of Paris, to a Senegalese mother. He is also of Malian descent. He acquired French nationality on 25 February 2002, through the collective effect connected to the reinstatement of his mother in French nationality.

== Career ==
Baradji was in the youth system of Cergy Pontoise from the age of 8 until 2012. He then trialled with Elche and signed a contract with the Under-19s. He returned to France after three months to complete his education, joining the Under-19 sides of L'Entente SSG and then Racing CFF.

A knee injury sidelined him for 8 months, but he joined Olympique Montigny at level ten in the French football pyramid in January 2015, when contacted by a coach he had worked under at Racing CFF. He scored 15 goals in four months, and earned a move four levels up the pyramid to OFC Les Mureaux, where he was top scorer in Division d'Honneur with 18 goals in 20 matches.

For the 2016–17 season, Baradji signed with Boulogne-Billancourt in Championnat National 2. After another good season he was signed by Red Star in June 2017.

At the end of December 2018, Baradji was loaned to Bourg-Péronnas until the end of the 2018–19 season, due to limited first team opportunities at Red Star.

In August 2020, Baradji left Red Star by mutual agreement. Before the end of the same month he signed with RC Grasse.
