= Cergy Pontoise FC =

Football club based in Cergy-Pontoise, France

Cergy Pontoise
- Full name: Cergy Pontoise Football Club
- Short name: CPFC
- Founded: 2005; 21 years ago
- Ground: Complexe Sportif Salif Keita
- President: Idriss Traoré
- League: Paris-Île-de-France Régional 2D
- Website: www.cergypontoisefootball.club

Cergy Pontoise Football Club is a football club based in Cergy-Pontoise, France. Founded in 2005, the club competes in the Paris-Île-de-France Régional 2D league , the seventh tier of French football, as of the 2025–26 season. The club's colours are blue and white.

== History ==
In 1905, Union Sportive Pontoisienne became the seventh club registered in the French Football Federation. In 1936, the club gained professional status, participating in the 1936–37 Division 3, a league that was abolished at the end of the campaign. The club subsequently returned to its amateur status. In 1947, a merger with Olympique de Saint-Denis created Olympique de Pontoise. The club again merged in 1984, this time with ASAN Football, to form Olympique de Cergy-Pontoise.

In 2005, Cergy Pontoise Football Club was formed following a merger of Olympique de Cergy-Pontoise and Union Sportive Cergy Clos.

Cergy Pontoise reached the seventh round of the Coupe de France for the first time in the club's history in the 2021–22 edition of the competition.

== Notable players ==
- (France) Adon Gomis
- (France) Sékou Baradji (youth)
- (France) Yarouba Cissako (youth)
- (France) Kévin Monzialo (youth)
- (France) Niels Nkounkou (youth)
- (France) Nsana Simon (youth)
- (France) Alexis Vossah (youth)
- (Lebanon) Lary Mehanna (youth)
