= 2023–24 Coupe de France preliminary rounds, Brittany =

French football competition

The 2023–24 Coupe de France preliminary rounds, Brittany is the qualifying competition to decide which teams from the leagues of the Brittany region of France take part in the main competition from the seventh round.

A total of fifteen teams will qualify from the Brittany section of the 2023–24 Coupe de France preliminary rounds.

In 2022–23, Stade Plabennécois progressed furthest in the main competition, reaching the round of 32, where they lost by a single goal to Grenoble.

== Draws and fixtures ==
On 27 June 2023, the league announced that 681 teams had entered the competition from the region. The draw for the first round was published on 25 August 2023, featuring 446 teams.

The second round draw was published on 30 August 2023, with 219 teams entering at this stage.

The third round draw was published on 6 September 2023, with 12 teams from Championnat National 3 and the qualifying team from Saint-Pierre-et-Miquelon entering at this stage. The fourth round draw, which saw the 3 teams from Championnat National 2 enter, was made on 20 September 2023. The fifth round draw was made on 4 October 2023. The sixth and final regional round draw was made on 18 October 2023.

=== First round ===
These matches were played on 26 and 27 August 2023, with one replayed on 1 September 2023.

First round results: Brittany
Tie no	Home team (tier)	Score	Away team (tier)
1.	US Plouisy (9)	3–1	FC Kreiz Breizh (10)
2.	Union Squiffiec-Trégonneau (9)	2–0	AS Servel-Lannion (9)
3.	ES Plougrasienne (10)	1–2	Avenir du Goëlo (9)
4.	Avenir Leff Le Faouët (11)	4–1	ES Ploulec'h (11)
5.	US Kérity (10)	0–9	AS Pleubian-Pleumeur (9)
6.	JA Penvénan (9)	5–1	CS Trégastel (10)
7.	Méné Bré Sports Pédernec (10)	2–4	Pléhédel Sport (11)
8.	AC La Harmoye	0–3 (Note: Tie won by means of forfeit.)	AS Trévé Sports (10)
9.	ASC Hippocampe La Chèze (11)	2–3	FC Centre Bretagne (9)
10.	FC Côte de Penthièvre (9)	7–0	FC Poulancre-Múr-Saint-Gilles (10)
11.	FC La Croix-Corlay (9)	1–1 (3–4 p)	AS Plussulien (9)
12.	Trieux FC (11)	0–4	ES Frout Saint-Agathon (10)
13.	US Trémel (11)	0–5	Stade Kénanais (9)
14.	US Pluzunet-Tonquédec (9)	0–9	Trégor FC (9)
15.	Goëlands de Plouézec FC (10)	1–3	SC Trédarzec (10)
16.	US Prat (11)	3–3 (5–6 p)	AS Ploumilliau (10)
17.	US Méné Bré Louargat (10)	0–4	CS Rospez (9)
18.	US Kergristoise (11)	0–4	Goëlo FC (9)
19.	US Hunaudaye (9)	12–0 (Note: Tie reversed from original draw.)	AL Trélat-Taden (11)
20.	Stade Évrannais (9)	2–2 (7–6 p)	US Plouasne-Saint-Juvat (9)
21.	ES Hénansal-Saint-Denoual-La Bouillie Emeraude (10)	2–1	ES Mélorienne (11)
22.	AS Pyramide Lanfains (11)	2–4	Saint-Brieuc Football Ouest (10)
23.	Gouessant Foot Coëtmieux-Andel-Morieux-Pommeret (10)	4–3	Mené FC (10)
24.	ES Guer (10)	0–3	US Plougonver (11)
25.	AS La Montagne (11)	0–3	AS Pabu Plein Air (9)
26.	US Trémorel (11)	0–3	Rance Coëtquen Football (9)
27.	ALSL Plémy (10)	0–2	AS Trégueux (9)
28.	US Argoat-Pélem (9)	3–0	AS Pludual (9)
29.	AS Kérien-Magoar (11)	0–3	ES Pommerit Le Merzer (9)
30.	ASC La Landec (11)	1–7	AS Broons-Trémeur (9)
31.	ES Saint-Cast-le-Guildo (10)	4–0	FC Quévertois (10)
32.	AS Grâces (9)	3–0	Étoile du Leff Boqueho (9)
33.	ES Pestivien (10)	0–3	FC La Chapelle-Neuve (10)
34.	AS Saint-Hervé (10)	1–2	AS Plenaltais Plaine-Haute (10)
35.	FC Plélan Vildé Corseul (9)	1–2	CS Lanrelas (9)
36.	FC Plouagat-Châtelaudren-Lanrodec (9)	4–0	FC Le Vieux Bourg (10
37.	FC Fréhel (12)	0–4	US Yvignac-la-Tour (9)
38.	AS Hillion-Saint-René (9)	5–0	JS Allineuc (9)
39.	CS Illifaut (10)	2–2 (4–5 p)	US Lanvallay (9)
40.	CS Croix Lambert (10)	1–1 (4–5 p)	AS Trémuson (10)
41.	Rance FC (10)	7–0	AS Guitté Guenroc (11)
42.	RC Dinan (10)	7–0	FC Bourseul (11)
43.	AS Motterieux (9)	1–0	US Saint-Caradec (10)
44.	FC L'Hermitage Lorge (10)	2–3	Étoile Sud Armor Porhoët (9)
45.	US Trieux-Lézardrieux-Pleudaniel (10)	3–0	UO Trégor (10)
46.	FC Plouezoc'h (10)	1–3	Étoile Trégoroise Plougasnou (9)
47.	Étoile Saint-Arzel (11)	0–3	US Plougonvelin (9)
48.	Cadets de Plougoulm (11)	0–16	Paotred Rosko (9)
49.	Stade Léonard Kreisker (10)	3–1	AS Santec (9)
50.	US Saint-Servais-Saint-Derrien (11)	0–7	FC des Enclos (10)
51.	AS Saint-Vougay (11)	0–5	FC Lanhouarneau-Plounévez-Lochrist (10)
52.	Hermine Kernilis (10)	1–1 (4–3 p)	FC Côte des Légendes (9)
53.	ÉS Guissényenne (10)	1–0	FC Plounéventer Plouédern (9)
54.	US Rochoise (11)	0–2	ES Mignonne (9)
55.	PL Pilier Rouge (10)	3–2	Légion Saint-Pierre (10)
56.	AS Ploumoguer (10)	1–9	ES Locmaria-Plouzané (9)
57.	AS Queliverzan (11)	3–0	PL Bergot (10)
58.	PL Lambézellec (11)	0–3	Association Cavale Blanche Brest (10)
59.	US Garlan (12)	2–6	US Lanmeur-Plouégat-Guérand (10)
60.	La Guerlesquinaise (11)	0–5	ES Pleyber-Christ (10)
61.	FC Gars du Roc'h (10)	1–3	ÉF Plougourvest (9)
62.	US Mespaul (10)	1–4	US Cléder (9)
63.	US Pencran (10)	0–2	Stade Landernéen Kergrèis (9)
64.	AS Coat-Méal (10)	0–0 (11–12 p)	Arzelliz Ploudalmézeau (9)
65.	AJA Brélès Lanildut (10)	1–4	SC Lanrivoaré (9)
66.	US Aber-Benoît Tréglonou (11)	1–3	Avel Vor Saint-Pabu (9)
67.	Gars Saint-Majan (10)	1–1 (8–9 p)	AS Landéda (9)
68.	ES Berrien-Huelgoat (10)	4–0	ES Scrignac Poullaouen (10)
69.	FC Sainte-Sève (10)	2–2 (3–1 p)	ES Douron (10)
70.	Avenir de Plourin (10)	2–2 (4–3 p)	US Taulé (9)
71.	US Morlaix (10)	1–4	US Plouigneau (9)
72.	JG Forestoise (11)	0–2	JS Saint-Thonanaise (9)
73.	RC Loperhet (10)	2–7	FA de la Rade (9)
74.	FC Le Drennec (10)	1–1 (4–2 p)	ASC Mahoraise Brest (9)
75.	Saint-Pierre Ploudiry-La Martyre (11)	1–3	Saint-Divy Sports (9)
76.	Ar'Goliath FC (11)	1–5	AS Pont-de-Buis (10)
77.	US Querrien (10)	0–9	AS Tréméven (9)
78.	Combrit Sainte-Marine FC (11)	1–8	US Pluguffan (9)
79.	La Raquette Tréméoc (11)	0–7	FC Pleuvennois (9)
80.	ÉS Saint-Jean-Trolimon (10)	0–4	FC Odet (9)
81.	ES Mahalon-Confort (10)	3–4	Gourlizon Sport (9)
82.	US Lennon (10)	3–2	ES Langolen (9)
83.	AS Saint-Yvi (10)	1–0	FC Rosporden (9)
84.	Tricolores Landrévarzec (10)	1–3	Paotred Briec (9)
85.	US Portugais Quimper (11)	0–3	Mélénicks Elliant (9)
86.	AS Tourc'h (11)	1–3	Edern Sports (9)
87.	Saint-Thois Sports (10)	1–4	Stade Pleybennois (9)
88.	US Saint Hernin (10)	0–3	Toros Plounévézel (10)
89.	AS Kernével (10)	0–1	Stade Mellacois (9)
90.	ES Rédené (10)	0–2	US Quimperloise (9)
91.	US Saint-Thurien (12)	2–2 (8–7 p)	Coquelicots du Trévoux (10)
92.	AS Baye La Morena (12)	1–1 (3–4 p)	US Clohars-Carnoët (10)
93.	AS Plouhinec (10)	1–2	ES Beuzec (9)
94.	ÉS Plonéis (10)	1–4	FC Goyen (10)
95.	Gars de Plomeur (10)	0–5	US Fouesnant (9)
96.	Racing Cast-Porzay (10)	5–3	US Quéménéven (9)
97.	ES Gouézec (11)	0–4	Gas du Menez-Hom (10)
98.	FC Penn-ar-Bed (10)	0–1	Goulien Sports (9)
99.	AC Carhaix (10)	3–3 (5–4 p)	PB Spézet (9)
100.	US Crozon-Morgat (10)	2–1	Lanvéoc Sports (9)
101.	AS Telgruc-sur-Mer (10)	0–4	FC Pen Hir Camaret (10)
102.	AS Melgven (10)	1–1 (4–2 p)	FC Aven-Bélon (9)
103.	US Landeleau (10)	1–2	Gars de Plonévez-du-Faou (10)
104.	ES Landudec-Guiler (11)	0–3	JS Plogastel (9)
105.	FC Bigouden (11)	1–2	Marcassins Sportif Tréogat (10)
106.	FC Treffiagat-Guilvinec (10)	2–1	AS Loctudy (10)
107.	US Kergloff (11)	3–7	US Châteauneuf-du-Faou (10)
108.	Écureuils de Roudouallec (11)	0–2	US Cléden-Poher (10)
109.	SS Saint-Goazec (11)	1–2	AS Gâs de Leuhan (10)
110.	FC Quimper Penhars (9)	1–1 (4–5 p)	CA Forestois (9)
111.	AS Diables du Juch (10)	0–0 (2–4 p)	Pouldergat Sport (10)
112.	AS Priziac (9)	1–1 (4–2 p)	JA Arzano (9)
113.	Avenir du Pays Pourleth (10)	3–1	ASC Kernascléden Lignol (11)
114.	ES Ségliennaise (11)	1–3	Stade Guémenois' (9)
115.	AS Calanaise (9)	1–1 (4–3 p)	Entente Saint-Gilloise (10)
116.	FC Quistinic (11)	1–1 (6–5 p)	Stade Landévantais (10)
117.	US Ploeren (10)	1–3	FC Quiberon Saint-Pierre (10)
118.	Hermine Locoal-Mendon (9)	4–2	Avenir Plumergat (10)
119.	AS Guermeur (9)	8–1	ES Merlevenez (10)
120.	FC Kerchopine (9)	2–2 (4–3 p)	ES Sud Outre Rade (9)
121.	ASC Baden (10)	0–4	ASC Sainte-Anne-d'Auray (10)
122.	CS Pluneret (9)	0–2 (Note: Original match abandoned due to serious injury to a player. Replayed on 1 September 2023.)	FC Locmariaquer-Saint-Philibert (9)
123.	AS Saint-Barthélemy (10)	4–2	Vigilante Radenac (10)
124.	Saint-Hubert Sport Lanouée (10)	4–3	ACS Bieuzy-les-Eaux (10)
125.	US Nostang (10)	2–5	AL Camors (9)
126.	Avenir Sainte-Hélène (10)	2–2 (3–1 p)	AS Kergonan (9)
127.	US Berné (11)	0–3	US Le Faouët (11)
128.	Garde du Loch (10)	2–1	AS Saint-Jean-Brévelay (10)
129.	ES Colpo (9)	6–0	AS Treffléan (10)
130.	Garde du Gohazé Saint Thuriau (9)	0–1	Garde Saint-Eloi Kerfourn (10)
131.	Fleur d'Ajonc Inzinzac (11)	1–4	Stade Hennebontais (9)
132.	US Langoëlan-Ploërdut (10)	2–4	Avenir Guiscriff (9)
133.	ES Langonnet (11)	0–2	US Lanvénégen (11)
134.	Etincelle Saint-Jean (11)	0–7	Saint-Sébastien Caden (9)
135.	Gentienne Pluherlin (11)	1–9	FC Saint-Perreux (9)
136.	Chevaliers Saint-Maurice Saint-Guyomard (11)	2–3	La Sérentaise (10)
137.	Saint-Pierre Pleugriffet (10)	2–1	Avenir Buléon-Lantillac (9)
138.	SC Sournais (9)	5–0	FC Gueltas Saint-Gérand Saint-Gonnery (10)
139.	FC Meslan (9)	2–1	Melrand Sports (10)
140.	US Saint-Nicolas avec Tréal (11)	3–5	AG Arzal (9)
141.	AS La Claie (9)	3–1	JF Noyal-Muzillac (9)
142.	CS Saint-Gaudence Allaire (10)	2–0	Saint-Clair Limerzel (10)
143.	FC Billio (10)	2–3	US Le Cours (10)
144.	Garde de l'Yvel Loyat (11)	0–5	Garde de Mi-Voie Guillac (10)
145.	Ecureils Roc-Saint-André (10)	3–0	US Paimpont-Concoret (11)
146.	AS Plouharnel (10)	0–0 (4–2 p)	Prat Poulfanc Sport (10)
147.	Plumelin Sports (10)	2–2 (5–4 p)	ES Remungol (9)
148.	VFL Keryado Lorient (10)	1–2	FC Kerzec (10)
149.	AS Bubry (10)	1–3	FL Inguiniel (9)
150.	ES Mériadec (10)	2–2 (3–1 p)	AS Belle-Île-en-Mer (9)
151.	AS Moustoir-Ac (9)	0–0 (4–5 p) (Note: US Rohannaise penalised for fielding a suspended player, AS Moustoir-Ac qualify.)	US Rohannaise (10)
152.	Garde Saint-Arnould Saint-Allouestre (11)	1–4	Gueltas FC (10)
153.	AS Saint-Eloi La Vraie-Croix (10)	2–3	La Mélécienne de Plumelec (10)
154.	Réveil de Lohéac (10)	0–1	FC Grand-Fougeray Sainte-Anne (9)
155.	AS Melting Villejean (10)	3–7	Espérance de Rennes (9)
156.	AS Saint-Malo-de-Phily (10)	1–6	US Noyal-Chatillon (9)
157.	Essé Le Theil FC (11)	4–3	FC Canton du Sel (10)
158.	US Bourgbarré (8)	7–0	US Tertre Gris (10)
159.	ASE Lécousse (10)	2–1 (Note: ASE Lécousse penalised for fielding a suspended player, US Saint-Marc/Saint-Ouen qualify.)	US Saint-Marc/Saint-Ouen (9)
160.	Fougères FC (10)	0–5	FC Louvigné-La Bazouge (9)
161.	US Les Brulais-Comblessac (11)	0–4	US Gaël Muel (9)
162.	AS Saint-Jacques (10)	3–4	Cercle Paul Bert Gayeulles (9)
163.	AC Redonnais (10)	3–2	US Sainte-Marie (9)
164.	Le Reveil Seglinois (11)	0–4	JA Pipriac (9)
165.	US Chapelloise (10)	0–8	JA Bréal (8)
166.	US Erbrée-Mondevert (11)	1–4	US Val d'Izé (9)
167.	ÉS Québriac (12)	0–1	AS Romillé (10)
168.	AS Tremblay-Chauvigné (10)	0–0 (4–2 p)	Rives Sportives du Couesnon (9)
169.	US Saint-Guinoux (11)	2–5	FC Bord de Rance (10)
170.	FC Plerguer Roz (10)	2–1	JA Saint-Servan (9)
171.	US Baguer-Morvan (10)	1–1 (5–4 p)	AS Saint-Pierraise Épiniac (9)
172.	Avenir Domalain (10)	2–7	AS Chantepie (9)
173.	AS Saint-Germain-du-Pinel (11)	0–8	US Illet Forêt (9)
174.	Hermine La Noë Blanche (10)	0–1	US Bel Air (9)
175.	Domloup Sport (10)	0–2	CS Servon (9)
176.	US Domagné-Saint-Didier (10)	1–3	Olympic Montreuil-Landavran (8)
177.	SC Luitré-Dompierre (11)	0–2	Haute Vilaine FC (9)
178.	US La Baie La Fresnais (11)	0–2	CS La Richardais (10)
179.	Hermine de Renac (10)	1–1 (4–5 p)	US Bain (9)
180.	US Bédée-Pleumeleuc (9)	2–1	AS Cheminots Rennais (10)
181.	AS Livré/Mecé (10)	1–2	ES Thorigné-Fouillard (9)
182.	ÉS Saint-Aubin-des-Landes/EF Cornillé (10)	1–6	AS Étrelles (8)
183.	FC Haute Bretagne Romantique (11)	0–6	JS Picanaise (10)
184.	La Mélorienne (10)	3–2	FC Baie du Mont Saint-Michel (9)
185.	Combourg SC (10)	1–0	FC La Mézière-Melesse (9)
186.	JS Nouvoitou (11)	0–3	Ossé Saint-Aubin (9)
187.	OC Brétillien (11)	2–5	US Orgères (9)
188.	USC Chavagne (9)	1–1 (0–3 p)	US Saint-Gilles (8)
189.	La Seiche FC (10)	1–1 (4–5 p)	Bleuets Le Pertre-Brielles-Gennes-Saint-Cyr (8)
190.	US Sens-de-Bretagne (10)	3–1	Jeunesse Combourgeoise (9)
191.	FC Stéphanais Briçois (10)	0–3	Espérance La Bouëxière (9)
192.	US Saint-Armel (9)	5–1	ASC Saint-Erblon (10)
193.	Cercle Paul Bert Villejean-Beauregard (10)	2–3	Breizh Fobal Klub (9)
194.	Entente Langan La Chapelle-Chaussée Football (11)	0–3	Montfort-Iffendic (9)
195.	AS Parthenay-de-Bretagne (11)	3–6	FC La Chapelle-Montgermont (9)
196.	RC Plesder (12)	1–2	UF Caradeuc (10)
197.	Association Châtillon-en-Vendelais/Princé (10)	0–4	Entente Parigné/Landéan (11)
198.	US Acigné (10)	1–3	Torcé-Vergéal FC (9)
199.	US Guignen (10)	2–7	US Laillé (9)
200.	FC Pays d'Anast (10)	1–0	Espérance Sixt-sur-Aff (8)
201.	AS Montreuil-le-Gast (10)	1–1 (6–5 p)	AS Ercé-près-Liffré (9)
202.	US Briacine (9)	2–0	FC Lantic (9)
203.	ASAC Hémonstoir (10)	0–3	JS Landéhen (10)
204.	FC Le Hinglé Trévron (10)	2–0	AS Saint-Pôtan (10)
205.	ES Saint-Germain/Montours (9)	5–0	Entente Sens-Vieux-Vy Gahard (10)
206.	US Médréac (10)	3–1	US Saint-Méen-Saint-Onen (9)
207.	FC Baulon-Lassy (10)	0–2	US Vern-sur-Seiche (9)
208.	Saint-Clair Réguiny (9)	0–2	Ajoncs d'Or Malguénac (9)
209.	Gazélec AC Morbihan (10)	1–1 (5–3 p)	Erdeven-Étel Foot (10)
210.	AS Meucon (9)	0–2	AS Pluvignoise (9)
211.	ES Surzur (10)	2–5	Ajoncs d'Or Saint-Nolff (10)
212.	AS Monterblanc (9)	2–2 (1–4 p)	ES Larré-Molac (9)
213.	Rah-Koëd Plaudren FC (9)	8–0	AS Berric-Lauzach (10)
214.	Bleuets Néant-sur-Yvel (10)	2–2 (6–5 p)	Cadets de Guéhenno (9)
215.	Avenir de Guilliers (10)	8–2	AS Monterrein (10)
216.	Caro/Missiriac AS (10)	3–0	OC Beignon (9)
217.	Avenir Campénéac Augan (9)	0–2	Indépendante Mauronnaise (9)
218.	Avenir Saint-Servant-sur-Oust (9)	4–0	Glaneurs de Lizio (10)
219.	AS Croix-Helléan (10)	2–5	Elan Montertelot (10)
220.	ES Quelneuc (10)	0–1	Fondelienne Carentoir (9)
221.	Les Fougerêts-Saint-Martin-sur-Oust (10)	2–2 (2–3 p)	FC Cournon 56 (10)
222.	Espoir Saint-Jacut-les-Pins (10)	0–2	JA Peillac (9)
223.	JA Pleucadeuc (10)	2–2 (4–5 p) (Note: Saint-Léon de Glénac penalised for fielding an ineligible player, JA Pleucadeuc qualify.)	Saint-Léon de Glénac (11)

=== Second round ===
These matches were played on 3 September 2023.

Second round results: Brittany
Tie no	Home team (tier)	Score	Away team (tier)
1.	AS Queliverzan (11)	2–5	Étoile Saint Laurent (7)
2.	AS Landeda (9)	1–1 (9–8 p)	Vie au Grand Air Bohars (8)
3.	US Plougonvelin (9)	0–3	Plouzané AC (7)
4.	Saint-Divy Sports (9)	1–1 (4–1 p)	Espérance Plouguerneau (8)
5.	FA de la Rade (9)	4–0	JS Saint-Thonanaise (9)
6.	ASPTT Brest (7)	1–2	FC Gouesnou (8)
7.	Arzelliz Ploudalmézeau (9)	1–2	CND Le Folgoët (9)
8.	Association Cavale Blanche Brest (10)	0–2	SC Lannilis (8)
9.	AL Coataudon (8)	1–2	Guipavas GdR (6)
10.	Avel Vor Saint-Pabu (9)	0–9	FC Lampaulais (8)
11.	PL Pilier Rouge (10)	1–3	ÉS Guissenyenne (10)
12.	AS Brest (7)	0–0 (4–5 p)	FC Le Relecq-Kerhuon (8)
13.	Hermine Kernilis (10)	0–2	AS Guilers (9)
14.	ES Locmaria-Plouzané (9)	1–1 (2–4 p)	SC Lanrivoaré (9)
15.	FC Le Drennec (10)	0–3	EA Saint-Renan (6)
16.	ES Carantec-Henvic (8)	0–2	AS Saint-Martin-des-Champs (9)
17.	Gars de Saint-Yves (7)	4–1	Landi FC (8)
18.	Stade Léonard Kreisker (10)	0–4	ES Saint-Thégonnec (7)
19.	Guiclan Plouénan FC (8)	2–2 (3–2 p)	Haut-Léon FC (8)
20.	US Plouigneau (9)	2–2 (1–4 p)	Étoile Saint-Yves Ploudaniel (8)
21.	ES Mignonne (9)	2–3	Saint-Pierre Plouescat (7)
22.	US Cléder (9)	1–4	JU Plougonven (8)
23.	FC Sainte-Sève (10)	0–10	AG Plouvorn (6)
24.	AS Pont-de-Buis (10)	0–1	Avenir de Plourin (10)
25.	Paotred Rosko (9)	1–2	AS Plouvien (7)
26.	ES Pleyber-Christ (10)	1–7	RC Lesnevien (7)
27.	ES Berrien-Huelgoat (10)	0–7	SC Morlaix (6)
28.	Stade Landernéen Kergrèis (9)	1–1 (3–4 p)	Étoile Trégoroise Plougasnou (9)
29.	AS Dirinon (9)	4–0	AS Kersaint (9)
30.	ÉF Plougourvest (9)	1–1 (2–3 p)	AS Sizun-Le Tréhou (8)
31.	FC des Enclos (10)	4–1	US Lanmeur-Plouégat-Guérand (10)
32.	Gas du Menez-Hom (10)	1–5	ÉS Plogonnec (7)
33.	Gourlizon Sport (9)	1–2	Amicale Ergué-Gabéric (7)
34.	US Crozon-Morgat (10)	3–0	Racing Cast-Porzay (10)
35.	FC Pen Hir Camaret (10)	0–4	Stella Maris Douarnenez (7)
36.	Edern Sports (9)	2–5	La Plozévetienne (8)
37.	US Châteauneuf-du-Faou (10)	1–5	US Lennon (10)
38.	Stade Pleybennois (9)	2–2 (4–2 p)	JS Plogastel (9)
39.	US Cléden-Poher (10)	0–7	US Saint-Évarzec (8)
40.	Dernières Cartouches Carhaix (7)	1–3 (Note: Landerneau FC penalised for fielding an ineligible players, Dernières Cartouches Carhaix qualify.)	Landerneau FC (6)
41.	FC Goyen (10)	0–3	AS Plomelin (9)
42.	US Pluguffan (9)	8–1	Pouldergat Sport (10)
43.	ES Beuzec (9)	2–4	Châteaulin FC (7)
44.	Paotred Briec (9)	3–2	Amicale Italia Bretagne (8)
45.	Gas d'Ys Tréboul (8)	1–5	Plougastel FC (6)
46.	Gars de Plonévez-du-Faou (10)	0–8	Quimper Ergué-Armel FC (8)
47.	Goulien Sports (9)	0–2	ES Cranou (8)
48.	US Saint-Thurien (12)	1–11	Toros Plounévézel (10)
49.	AS Gâs de Leuhan (10)	0–3	FC Odet (9)
50.	FC Pleuvennois (9)	4–5	FC Pont-l'Abbé (7)
51.	AS Saint-Yvi (10)	1–6	Plonéour FC (8)
52.	FC Quimperlois (7)	2–1	EA Scaër (7)
53.	Mélénicks Elliant (9)	2–2 (7–6 p)	Fleur de Genêt Bannalec (8)
54.	AS Tréméven (9)	0–7	US Trégunc (6)
55.	US Fouesnant (9)	2–1	Hermine Concarnoise (8)
56.	AC Carhaix (10)	0–10	US Moëlan (7)
57.	CA Forestois (9)	4–1	Espoir Clohars Fouesnant (8)
58.	Stade Mellacois (9)	1–3	AS Plobannalec-Lesconil (7)
59.	Cormorans Sportif de Penmarc'h (8)	4–0	Glaziks de Coray (9)
60.	US Clohars-Carnoët (10)	2–0	ES Névez (9)
61.	US Quimperloise (9)	1–2	Gourin FC (7)
62.	AS Melgven (10)	0–11	Quimper Kerfeunteun FC (6)
63.	Marcassins Sportif Tréogat (10)	4–0	FC Treffiagat-Guilvinec (10)
64.	US Callac (9)	1–3	AS Plestinaise (8)
65.	US Pays Rochois et Langoatais (9)	0–5	JA Penvénan (9)
66.	Trégor FC (9)	2–1	US Ploubezre (9)
67.	CS Rospez (9)	1–4	US Perros-Louannec (8)
68.	AS Grâces (9)	0–1	Entente du Trieux FC (8)
69.	AS Ploumilliau (10)	1–9	CS Bégard (6)
70.	Avenir du Goëlo (9)	0–3	Stade Paimpolais FC (7)
71.	FC Trébeurden-Pleumeur-Bodou (8)	5–1	Union Squiffiec-Trégonneau (9)
72.	AS Pleubian-Pleumeur (9)	0–5	JS Cavan (7)
73.	FC La Chapelle-Neuve (10)	0–6	SC Trédarzec (10)
74.	US Plougonver (11)	2–5	US Plouisy (9)
75.	Stade Kénanais (9)	1–2	US Trieux-Lézardrieux-Pleudaniel (10)
76.	Évron FC (8)	0–1	Plérin FC (8)
77.	Pléhédel Sport (11)	0–1	AS Pabu Plein Air (9)
78.	Goëlo FC (9)	1–5	Ploufragan FC (7)
79.	Saint-Brieuc Football Ouest (10)	1–1 (1–4 p)	AS Plélo (8)
80.	US Goudelin (8)	0–2	CO Briochin Sportif Ploufraganais (6)
81.	US Briacine (9)	1–4	Pordic-Binic FC (7)
82.	ES Frout Saint-Agathon (10)	2–1	JS Lanvollon (8)
83.	AS Trégueux (9)	0–6	AS Ginglin Cesson (6)
84.	Gouessant Foot Coëtmieux-Andel-Morieux-Pommeret (10)	2–2 (0–3 p)	AS Trémuson (10)
85.	ES Pommerit Le Merzer (9)	1–6	RC Ploumagoar (7)
86.	US Saint-Carreuc-Hénon (8)	4–1	AS Hillion-Saint-René (9)
87.	AS Broons-Trémeur (9)	1–3	Les Vallées FC (8)
88.	US Yvignac-la-Tour (9)	3–0	US Frémur-Fresnaye (9)
89.	CS Lanrelas (9)	1–2	Val d'Arguenon Créhen-Pluduno (8)
90.	ES Hénansal-Saint-Denoual-La Bouillie Emeraude (10)	0–8	Stade Pleudihennais (7)
91.	RC Dinan (10)	4–0	US Hunaudaye (9)
92.	Dahus du Mont Bel-Air (8)	0–0 (2–3 p)	FC Beaussais-Rance-Frémur (9)
93.	FC Le Hinglé Trévron (10)	1–2	Plancoët-Arguenon FC (7)
94.	Rance Coëtquen Football (9)	2–2 (5–6 p)	FC Côte de Penthièvre (9)
95.	US Erquy (8)	1–1 (1–4 p)	AS Trélivan (7)
96.	US Lanvallay (9)	2–1	CS Merdrignac (8)
97.	ES Saint-Cast-le-Guildo (10)	0–0 (4–3 p)	Stade Évrannais (9)
98.	FC Lié (8)	1–1 (6–7 p)	Rostrenen FC (8)
99.	AS Motterieux (9)	2–3	CS Plédran (7)
100.	FC Centre Bretagne (9)	0–1	FC Moncontour-Trédaniel (9)
101.	La Ploeucoise Foot (8)	1–3	FC Saint-Bugan (8)
102.	Saint-Brandan-Quintin FC (7)	0–4	Loudéac OSC (6)
103.	ASL Saint-Julien (9)	1–0	US Argoat-Pélem (9)
104.	JS Landéhen (10)	3–1	AS Uzel-Merléac (8)
105.	AS Plenaltais Plaine-Haute (10)	0–6	US Quessoy (7)
106.	AS Plussulien (9)	1–9	US Langueux (6)
107.	AS Trévé Sports (10)	0–5	Plaintel SF (7)
108.	FC Lanhouarneau-Plounévez-Lochrist (10)	0–4	ES Portsall Kersaint (7)
109.	Étoile Sud Armor Porhoët (9)	0–3	Plounévez-Lanrivain-Trémargat US (9)
110.	Lamballe FC (6)	11–0 (Note: Tie reversed from original draw.)	Rance FC (10)
111.	AC Redonnais (10)	0–4	FC Atlantique Vilaine (6)
112.	Avenir de Lieuron (8)	1–1 (3–1 p)	Cadets de Bains (6)
113.	SEP Quédillac (8)	0–3	US Grégorienne (7)
114.	US Billé-Javené (8)	1–0	Stade Castelbourgeois FC (7)
115.	JS Picanaise (10)	1–6	AS Miniac-Morvan (8)
116.	AS Romillé (10)	1–16	CS Betton (7)
117.	US Gévezé (8)	2–5	OC Montauban (6)
118.	US Val d'Izé (9)	0–6	Noyal-Brécé FC (8)
119.	Cercle Paul Bert Gayeulles (9)	3–2	Eskouadenn de Brocéliande (7)
120.	US Bel Air (9)	0–6	Espérance Chartres-de-Bretagne (6)
121.	FC Pays d'Anast (10)	0–4	SC Le Rheu (7)
122.	US Gaël Muel (9)	1–6	AS Vignoc-Hédé-Guipel (6)
123.	Stade Saint-Aubinais (8)	0–6	OC Cesson (6)
124.	Entente Parigné/Landéan (11)	1–6	Olympic Montreuil-Landavran (8)
125.	JA Pipriac (9)	0–2	FC Guichen (7)
126.	CS La Richardais (10)	1–5	AS Pays Malouin (8)
127.	Breizh Fobal Klub (9)	0–5	FC Guipry Messac (6)
128.	AS Chantepie (9)	1–2	US Bédée-Pleumeleuc (9)
129.	US Janzé (8)	1–1 (8–9 p)	Jeunes d'Argentré (8)
130.	FC Bord de Rance (10)	1–4	La Cancalaise (8)
131.	Haute Vilaine FC (9)	0–2	AS Étrelles (8)
132.	AS Montreuil-le-Gast (10)	0–5	CO Pacéen (7)
133.	AS Tremblay-Chauvigné (10)	0–5	Bocage FC (8)
134.	Montfort-Iffendic (9)	0–0 (2–3 p)	AC Rennes (8)
135.	Ossé Saint-Aubin (9)	2–0	ASC Romagné (8)
136.	US Châteaugiron (8)	1–0	Cadets Chelun Martigné-Ferchaud (8)
137.	US Baguer-Morvan (10)	2–2 (5–6 p)	US Château-Malo (7)
138.	US Saint-Marc/Saint-Ouen (9)	0–2	FC Louvigné-La Bazouge (9)
139.	Combourg SC (10)	3–0	Pleurtuit Côte d'Emeraude (8)
140.	US Vern-sur-Seiche (9)	0–1	FC Mordelles (8)
141.	FC Grand-Fougeray Sainte-Anne (9)	1–4	US Noyal-Chatillon (9)
142.	Espérance de Rennes (9)	0–5	AS Retiers-Coësmes (7)
143.	US Bain (9)	1–2	JA Bréal (8)
144.	FC Plerguer Roz (10)	1–3	FC Dinardais (7)
145.	Espérance La Bouëxière (9)	1–2	FC Aubinois (8)
146.	US Laillé (9)	1–2	US Liffré (6)
147.	CS Servon (9)	1–4	US Saint-Gilles (8)
148.	US Sens-de-Bretagne (10)	0–4	La Vitréenne FC (8)
149.	Essé Le Theil FC (11)	0–2	US Saint-Armel (9)
150.	US Médréac (10)	0–7	FC Breteil-Talensac (6)
151.	La Mélorienne (10)	2–2 (4–2 p)	US Saint-Jouan-des-Guérets (8)
152.	US Bourgbarré (8)	1–2	FC Bruz (7)
153.	Torcé-Vergéal FC (9)	1–3	JA Balazé (8)
154.	AS Jacques Cartier (8)	1–1 (3–4 p)	Entente Samsonnaise Doloise (6)
155.	ES Saint-Germain/Montours (9)	0–3	US Gosné (8)
156.	US Illet Forêt (9)	2–3	FC La Chapelle-Montgermont (9)
157.	US Orgères (9)	1–0	Stade Louvignéen (8)
158.	Bleuets Le Pertre-Brielles-Gennes-Saint-Cyr (8)	1–5	RC Rannée-La Guerche-Drouges (6)
159.	Avenir Irodouër (8)	3–0 (Note: Tie won by means of forfeit.)	FC Hermitage-Chapelle-Cintré (9)
160.	ES Thorigné-Fouillard (9)	0–5	FC Beauregard Rennes (7)
161.	UF Caradeuc (10)	0–1	FC Tinténiac-Saint-Domineuc (8)
162.	Stade Guémenois (9)	0–5	US Montagnarde (6)
163.	US Lanvénégen (11)	0–15	FC Meslan (9)
164.	AS Calanaise (9)	1–0	Stiren Cléguer FC (9)
165.	Avenir du Pays Pourleth (10)	1–4	La Guideloise (8)
166.	Caudan SF (9)	1–2	FC Plouay (8)
167.	Avenir Guiscriff (9)	3–3 (3–2 p)	FC Kerchopine (9)
168.	US Le Faouët (11)	3–2	FC Quistinic (11)
169.	FL Inguiniel (9)	3–2	AS Priziac (9)
170.	FC Kerzec (10)	0–1	CS Quéven (8)
171.	Baud FC (7)	1–1 (5–6 p)	Lorient Sports (7)
172.	AL Camors (9)	0–6	Saint-Efflam Kervignac (8)
173.	Avenir Sainte-Hélène (10)	0–4	US Goëlands de Larmor-Plage (7)
174.	FOLC Lorient Ouest (8)	5–0 (Note: Both clubs penalised for fielding suspended players, neither qualify.)	AS Lanester (9)
175.	Riantec OC (8)	2–2 (5–4 p)	AS Guermeur (9)
176.	Stade Hennebontais (9)	0–2	FC Ploemeur (6)
177.	Plouhinec FC (7)	8–0	Landaul Sports (8)
178.	AS Pluvignoise (9)	2–2 (3–5 p)	Languidic FC (8)
179.	Guénin Sport (8)	0–4	Keriolets de Pluvigner (6)
180.	CS Pluméliau (8)	0–2	Garde Saint-Cyr Moréac (8)
181.	AS Saint-Barthélemy (10)	0–4	CS Bignan (7)
182.	Garde Saint-Eloi Kerfourn (10)	2–1	FC Klegereg (8)
183.	SC Sournais (9)	1–5	Espérance Bréhan (8)
184.	Saint-Pierre Pleugriffet (10)	0–5	FC Naizin (8)
185.	Ajoncs d'Or Malguénac (9)	1–1 (4–1 p)	Plumelin Sports (10)
186.	Garde du Loch (10)	5–1	Hermine Locoal-Mendon (9)
187.	ES Colpo (9)	0–0 (3–4 p)	CEP Lorient (6)
188.	ES Mériadec (10)	1–2	ES Plescop (7)
189.	Semeurs de Grand-Champ (8)	1–2	AS Plougoumelen-Bono (8)
190.	FC Quiberon Saint-Pierre (10)	3–2	ASC Sainte-Anne-d'Auray (10)
191.	AS Plouharnel (10)	2–4	ES Crac'h (9)
192.	US Brech (8)	2–2 (4–2 p)	FC Bélugas Ria (8)
193.	US Arradon (9)	0–2	Auray FC (7)
194.	Enfants de Guer (8)	2–2 (2–3 p)	Aurore de Taupont (9)
195.	Indépendante Mauronnaise (9)	5–0	Garde de Mi-Voie Guillac (10)
196.	Avenir de Guilliers (10)	0–5	Ploërmel FC (6)
197.	Ecureils Roc-Saint-André (10)	1–5	CS Josselin (8)
198.	Bleuets Néant-sur-Yvel (10)	0–4	AS Cruguel (8)
199.	Fondelienne Carentoir (9)	4–3	Avenir Saint-Servant-sur-Oust (9)
200.	Elan Montertelot (10)	3–1	Caro/Missiriac AS (10)
201.	Enfants de Saint-Gildas (9)	1–4	US Saint-Abraham Chapelle-Caro (9)
202.	FC Saint-Perreux (9)	2–0	Elvinoise Foot (7)
203.	ES Larré-Molac (9)	2–4	Rah-Koëd Plaudren FC (9)
204.	JA Peillac (9)	0–2	FC Cournon 56 (10)
205.	US Le Cours (10)	1–2	US La Gacilly (7)
206.	La Patriote Malansac (8)	3–1	AS La Claie (9)
207.	La Sérentaise (10)	0–4	Ruffiac-Malestroit (7)
208.	EFC Saint-Jean-Brévelay (8)	1–3	Séné FC (6)
209.	Saint-Sébastien Caden (9)	3–1	Gazélec AC Morbihan (10)
210.	Armoricaine Péaule (9)	0–1	FC Basse Vilaine (8)
211.	Sarzeau FC (8)	4–0	CS Saint-Gaudence Allaire (10)
212.	US Saint-Melaine Rieux (8)	1–1 (3–5 p)	Garde du Pont Marzan (8)
213.	ES Saint-Avé (8)	1–0	Muzillac OS (7)
214.	Montagnards Sulniac (9)	0–2	Avenir Theix (7)
215.	Ajoncs d'Or Saint-Nolff (10)	0–4	AG Arzal (9)
216.	Bogue D'Or Questembert (9)	0–5	AS Ménimur (6)
217.	Gueltas FC (10)	0–2	Moutons Blanc de Noyal-Pontivy (7)
218.	Saint-Hubert Sport Lanouée (10)	0–12	AS Moustoir-Ac (9)
219.	La Mélécienne de Plumelec (10)	4–0	JA Pleucadeuc (10)
220.	FC Locmariaquer-Saint-Philibert (9)	0–4	ES Ploemel (8)
221.	FC Plouagat-Châtelaudren-Lanrodec (9)	8–0	Avenir Leff Le Faouët (11)

=== Third round ===
These matches were played on 16 and 17 September 2023.

Third round results: Ille-et-Vilaine
Tie no	Home team (tier)	Score	Away team (tier)
1.	CO Pacéen (7)	1–0	A.S. Saint Pierraise (Saint Pierre and Miquelon)
2.	Ossé Saint-Aubin (9)	0–3	TA Rennes (5)
3.	Jeunes d'Argentré (8)	0–0 (7–6 p)	US Orgères (9)
4.	SC Le Rheu (7)	2–2 (5–4 p)	FC Guipry-Messac (6)
5.	JA Bréal (8)	1–1 (7–6 p)	JA Balazé (8)
6.	AC Rennes (8)	3–1	Noyal-Brécé FC (8)
7.	FC Bruz (7)	3–2	OC Cesson (6)
8.	AS Étrelles (8)	2–1	FC Guichen (7)
9.	FC Mordelles (8)	1–2	FC Atlantique Vilaine (6)
10.	AS Retiers-Coësmes (7)	0–2	Avenir Lieuron (8)
11.	La Vitréenne FC (8)	0–9	AS Vitré (5)
12.	Cercle Paul Bert Gayeulles (9)	0–5	Espérance Chartres-de-Bretagne (6)
13.	US Noyal-Châtillon (9)	1–2	US Châteaugiron (8)
14.	Olympic Montreuil-Landavran (8)	0–2	RC Rannée-La Guerche-Drouges (6)
15.	US Saint-Armel (9)	0–1	FC Beauregard Rennes (7)
16.	AS Pays Malouin (8)	4–1	FC La Chapelle-Montgermont (9)
17.	La Mélorienne (10)	1–2	US Billé-Javené (8)
18.	Bocage FC (8)	0–3	FC Breteil-Talensac (6)
19.	US Gosné (8)	2–0	OC Montauban (6)
20.	US Bédée-Pleumeleuc (9)	1–3	US Saint-Gilles (8)
21.	AS Miniac-Morvan (8)	0–2	La Cancalaise (8)
22.	CS Betton (7)	1–0	FC Tinténiac-Saint-Domineuc (8)
23.	Avenir Irodouër (8)	0–6	Cercle Paul Bert Bréquigny (5)
24.	US Grégorienne (7)	0–2	Entente Samsonnaise Doloise (6)
25.	Combourg SC (10)	3–0	FC Aubinois (8)
26.	US Château-Malo (7)	0–4	US Fougères (5)
27.	FC Dinardais (7)	2–2 (2–3 p)	US Liffré (6)
28.	FC Louvigné-La Bazouge (9)	2–7	AS Vignoc-Hédé-Guipel (6)

Third round results: Finistère
Tie no	Home team (tier)	Score	Away team (tier)
29.	FC Odet (9)	1–3	AS Plobannalec-Lesconil (7)
30.	US Fouesnant (9)	2–1	Avenir Guiscriff (9)
31.	Plonéour FC (8)	0–3	Stella Maris Douarnenez (7)
32.	Quimper Kerfeunteun FC (6)	3–1	US Trégunc (6)
33.	Marcassins Sportif Tréogat (10)	0–8	PD Ergué-Gabéric (5)
34.	US Saint-Évarzec 8)	3–2	AS Plomelin (9)
35.	US Moëlan (6)	2–3	La Plozévetienne (8)
36.	US Pluguffan (9)	3–0	Mélénicks Elliant (9)
37.	Gourin FC (7)	4–2	FC Quimperlois (7)
38.	US Clohars-Carnoët (10)	1–4	Cormorans Sportif de Penmarc'h (8)
39.	CA Forestois (9)	5–3	FC Pont-l'Abbé (7)
40.	ES Saint-Thégonnec (7)	1–2	Châteaulin FC (7)
41.	Avenir Plourin (10)	2–1	Paotred Briec (9)
42.	FA de la Rade (9)	3–3 (1–3 p)	ES Plogonnec (7)
43.	FC des Enclos (10)	0–1	ES Cranou (8)
44.	Quimper Ergué-Armel FC (8)	0–2	Saint-Pierre de Milizac (5)
45.	AS Dirinon (9)	1–2	Plougastel FC (6)
46.	AS Sizun-Le Tréhou (8)	4–2	Guiclan Plouénan FC (8)
47.	US Crozon-Morgat (10)	1–4	JU Plougonven (8)
48.	US Lennon (10)	0–4	Étoile Saint Laurent (7)
49.	Amicale Ergué-Gabéric (7)	2–0	FC Le Relecq-Kerhuon (8)
50.	Toros Plounévézel (10)	1–9	Guipavas GdR (6)
51.	Stade Pleybennois (9)	2-7	Dernières Cartouches Carhaix (7)
52.	Plouzané AC (7)	1–1 (4–5 p)	Stade Plabennécois (5)
53.	Étoile Saint-Yves Ploudaniel (8)	0–2	Gars de Saint-Yves (7)
54.	ES Portsall Kersaint (7)	4–1	FC Lampaulais (8)
55.	AS Guilers (9)	1–6	RC Lesnevien (7)
56.	AS Saint-Martin-des-Champs (9)	4–4 (5–4 p)	ÉS Guissenyenne (10)
57.	SC Lanrivoaré (9)	3–2	FC Gouesnou (8)
58.	Saint-Pierre Plouescat (7)	0–2	EA Saint-Renan (6)
59.	Étoile Trégoroise Plougasnou (9)	0–2	SC Lannilis (8)
60.	Saint-Divy Sports (9)	0–3	SC Morlaix (6)
61.	CND Le Folgoët (9)	0–0 (3–0 p)	AS Landeda (9)
62.	AS Plouvien (7)	0–4	AG Plouvorn (6)

Third round results: Côtes-d'Armor
Tie no	Home team (tier)	Score	Away team (tier)
63.	US Trieux-Lézardrieux-Pleudaniel (10)	1–9	JS Cavan (7)
64.	SC Trédarzec (10)	1–4	CS Bégard (6)
65.	US Plouisy (9)	3–2	AS Pabu Plein Air (9)
66.	AS Ginglin Cesson (6)	3–1	CO Briochin Sportif Ploufraganais (6)
67.	Plounévez-Lanrivain-Trémargat US (9)	1–1 (2–1 p)	AS Plélo (8)
68.	Pordic-Binic FC (7)	1–1 (3–4 p)	Rostrenen FC (8)
69.	AS Trémuson (10)	0–2	Plaintel SF (7)
70.	ASL Saint-Julien (9)	0–3	US Saint-Carreuc-Hénon (8)
71.	Plérin FC (8)	4–5	US Langueux (6)
72.	FC Plouagat-Châtelaudren-Lanrodec (9)	1–4	Ploufragan FC (7)
73.	CS Plédran (7)	2–2 (4–5 p)	US Quessoy (7)
74.	US Lanvallay (9)	1–4	US Yvignac-la-Tour (9)
75.	RC Dinan (10)	0–3	Loudéac OSC (6)
76.	FC Côte de Penthièvre (9)	1–6	Plancoët Arguenon FC (7)
77.	Stade Pleudihennais (7)	4–1	Les Vallées FC (8)
78.	JS Landéhen (10)	2–10	Lamballe FC (6)
79.	Val d'Arguenon Créhen-Pluduno (8)	0–0 (4–5 p)	FC Beaussais-Rance-Frémur (9)
80.	FC Moncontour-Trédaniel (9)	2–0	AS Trélivan (7)
81.	ES Saint-Cast-le-Guildo (10)	1–1 (2–4 p)	FC Saint-Bugan (8)
82.	RC Ploumagoar (7)	3–0	AS Plestinaise (8)
83.	Entente du Trieux FC (8)	1–5	Stade Paimpolais FC (7)
84.	Trégor FC (9)	0–8	Lannion FC (5)
85.	JA Penvénan (9)	3–1	ES Frout Saint-Agathon (10)
86.	US Perros-Louannec (8)	– (Note: The match was stopped after serious injury to two FC Trébeurden-Pleumeur-Bodou players. FC Trébeurden-Pleumeur-Bodou did not want to restart the game, and were penalised. US Perros-Louannec qualify.)	FC Trébeurden-Pleumeur-Bodou (8)

Third round results: Morbihan
Tie no	Home team (tier)	Score	Away team (tier)
87.	US Brech (8)	0–2	AS Ménimur (6)
88.	ES Saint-Avé (8)	0–1	Vannes OC (5)
89.	CS Quéven (8)	1–5	US Montagnarde (6)
90.	AS Moustoir-Ac (9)	1–1 (2–4 p)	ES Crac'h (9)
91.	Elan Montertelot (10)	0–1	Garde Saint-Eloi Kerfourn (10)
92.	FC Cournon 56 (10)	4–0	Riantec OC (8)
93.	Languidic FC (8)	0–2	Lorient Sport (7)
94.	La Mélécienne de Plumelec (10)	3–1	CS Josselin (8)
95.	Espérance Bréhan (8)	1–4	Plouhinec FC (7)
96.	Saint-Efflam Kervignac (8)	3–1	Fondelienne Carentoir (9)
97.	AS Plougoumelen-Bono (8)	0–6	FC Ploemeur (6)
98.	Auray FC (7)	1–0	La Guideloise (8)
99.	US Le Faouët (11)	0–8	ES Ploemel (8)
100.	AG Arzal (9)	0–0 (5–4 p)	Moutons Blanc de Noyal-Pontivy (7)
101.	Sarzeau FC (8)	4–1	Ajoncs d'Or Malguénac (9)
102.	AS Calanaise (9)	0–3	Saint-Colomban Sportive Locminé (5)
103.	FC Naizin (8)	1–1 (4–2 p)	Indépendante Mauronnaise (9)
104.	US Saint-Abraham Chapelle-Caro (9)	0–0 (4–3 p)	Aurore de Taupont (9)
105.	Rah-Koëd Plaudren FC (9)	1–3	Séné FC (6)
106.	FC Meslan (9)	0–1	FC Saint-Perreux (9)
107.	FC Plouay (8)	0–4	Ploërmel FC (6)
108.	FC Basse Vilaine (8)	2–3	CEP Lorient (6)
109.	Ruffiac-Malestroit (7)	1–2	CS Bignan (7)
110.	Avenir Theix (7)	2–2 (4–5 p)	La Patriote Malansac (8)
111.	FL Inguiniel (9)	0–2	US La Gacilly (7)
112.	Saint-Sébastien Caden (9)	0–10	Stade Pontivyen (5)
113.	AS Cruguel (8)	2–4	Keriolets de Pluvigner (6)
114.	Garde du Pont Marzan (8)	1–6	GSI Pontivy (5)
115.	walkover (Note: AS Lanester and FOLC Lorient Ouest penalised in round 2 match 174.)	–	FC Quiberon Saint-Pierre (10)
116.	Garde du Loch (10)	2–2 (2–4 p)	Garde Saint-Cyr Moréac (8)
117.	ES Plescop (7)	4–1	US Goëlands de Larmor-Plage (7)

=== Fourth round ===
These matches were played on 30 September and 1 October 2023.

Fourth round results: Brittany
Tie no	Home team (tier)	Score	Away team (tier)
1.	CND Le Folgoët (9)	2–1	Avenir Plourin (10)
2.	SC Lanrivoaré (9)	1–2	EA Saint-Renan (6)
3.	JU Plougonven (8)	1–0	ES Portsall Kersaint (8)
4.	Étoile Saint Laurent (7)	1–0	AG Plouvorn (6)
5.	Gars de Saint-Yves (7)	2–2 (5–6 p)	RC Ploumagoar (7)
6.	Plounévez-Lanrivain-Trémargat US (9)	1–4	Stade Paimpolais FC (7)
7.	JA Penvénan (9)	1–1 (3–0 p)	AS Saint-Martin-des-Champs (9)
8.	US Perros-Louannec (8)	0–1	Plougastel FC (6)
9.	AS Sizun-Le Tréhou (8)	1–3	CS Bégard (6)
10.	RC Lesnevien (7)	0–2	SC Morlaix (6)
11.	Guipavas GdR (6)	4–1	JS Cavan (7)
12.	Saint-Pierre de Milizac (5)	1–3	Stade Plabennécois (5)
13.	SC Lannilis (8)	1–2	AS Ginglin Cesson (6)
14.	ES Cranou (8)	2–4	Stade Briochin (4)
15.	Ploufragan FC (7)	0–5	Lannion FC (5)
16.	Keriolets de Pluvigner (6)	6–1	Gourin FC (7)
17.	Saint-Colomban Sportive Locminé (5)	0–2	Stade Pontivyen (5)
18.	Garde Saint-Eloi Kerfourn (10)	0–2	FC Quiberon Saint-Pierre (10)
19.	CEP Lorient (6)	0–4	Stella Maris Douarnenez (7)
20.	US Montagnarde (6)	1–0	Quimper Kerfeunteun FC (6)
21.	ES Crac'h (9)	0–1	La Plozévetienne (8)
22.	US Pluguffan (9)	0–4	AS Plobannalec-Lesconil (7)
23.	CA Forestois (9)	2–3	Lorient Sport (7)
24.	PD Ergué-Gabéric (5)	1–0	FC Ploemeur (6)
25.	US Fouesnant (9)	1–7	GSI Pontivy (5)
26.	ES Ploemel (8)	1–1 (1–3 p)	Rostrenen FC (8)
27.	ES Plogonnec (7)	2–1	Saint-Efflam Kervignac (8)
28.	Dernières Cartouches Carhaix (7)	3–0	Amicale Ergué-Gabéric (7)
29.	Plouhinec FC (7)	6–1	US Saint-Évarzec (8)
30.	Châteaulin FC (7)	3–2	Cormorans Sportif de Penmarc'h (8)
31.	La Patriote Malansac (8)	0–1	Espérance Chartres-de-Bretagne (6)
32.	AS Étrelles (8)	0–5	TA Rennes (5)
33.	FC Beauregard Rennes (7)	2–1	FC Bruz (7)
34.	CS Bignan (7)	0–3	Cercle Paul Bert Bréquigny (5)
35.	US Châteaugiron (8)	1–0	Séné FC (6)
36.	FC Naizin (8)	3–0	Jeunes d’Argentré (8)
37.	Ploërmel FC (6)	2–1	RC Rannée-La Guerche-Drouges (6)
38.	FC Cournon 56 (10)	0–4	SC Le Rheu (7)
39.	FC Atlantique Vilaine (6)	1–1 (4–5 p)	AS Ménimur (6)
40.	Garde Saint-Cyr Moréac (8)	1–3	Vannes OC (5)
41.	US Saint-Abraham Chapelle-Caro (9)	0–2	US Saint-Malo (4)
42.	FC Saint-Perreux (9)	2–3	Auray FC (7)
43.	La Mélécienne de Plumelec (10)	0–4	US La Gacilly (7)
44.	AG Arzal (9)	0–12	ES Plescop (7)
45.	Avenir Lieuron (7)	3–2	Sarzeau FC (8)
46.	JA Bréal (8)	0–3	US Fougères (5)
47.	US Langueux (6)	0–1	CO Pacéen (7)
48.	Plaintel SF (7)	0–2	AC Rennes (8)
49.	US Billé-Javène (8)	4–3	AS Pays Malouin (8)
50.	US Yvignac-la-Tour (9)	1–4	FC Breteil-Talensac (6)
51.	FC Moncontour-Trédaniel (9)	1–2	Entente Samsonnaise Doloise (6)
52.	US Liffré (6)	4–0	Stade Pleudihennais (7)
53.	FC Beaussais-Rance-Frémur (9)	1–1 (3–4 p)	CS Betton (7)
54.	US Quessoy (7)	2–5	AS Vitré (5)
55.	US Gosné (8)	0–1	Lamballe FC (6)
56.	US Saint-Gilles (8)	1–1 (3–1 p)	Plancoët Arguenon FC (7)
57.	US Plouisy (9)	0–8	Dinan Léhon FC (4)
58.	US Saint-Carreuc-Hénon (8)	3–2	La Cancalaise (8)
59.	Combourg SC (10)	0–3 (Note: The match was stopped after a serious injury to a Combourg SC player. Combourg SC did not want to restart the game. AS Vignoc-Hédé-Guipel qualify.)	AS Vignoc-Hédé-Guipel (6)
60.	FC Saint-Bugan (8)	1–3	Loudéac OSC (6)

=== Fifth round ===
These matches were played on 14 and 15 October 2023.

Fifth round results: Brittany
Tie no	Home team (tier)	Score	Away team (tier)
1.	Stade Paimpolais FC (7)	1–0	Lannion FC (5)
2.	Stella Maris Douarnenez (7)	0–3	Stade Plabennécois (5)
3.	ES Plogonnec (7)	0–6	GSI Pontivy (5)
4.	RC Ploumagoar (7)	2–1	SC Morlaix (6)
5.	AS Plobannalec-Lesconil (7)	1–0	La Plozévetienne (8)
6.	CND Le Folgoët (9)	1–1 (1–3 p)	Loudéac OSC (6)
7.	CS Bégard (6)	1–2	Plouhinec FC (7)
8.	US Montagnarde (6)	0–1	Stade Briochin (4)
9.	JU Plougonven (8)	0–3	Stade Pontivyen (5)
10.	Guipavas GdR (6)	8–0	Châteaulin FC (7)
11.	Lorient Sport (7)	3–5	PD Ergué-Gabéric (5)
12.	Rostrenen FC (8)	0–1	Plougastel FC (6)
13.	EA Saint-Renan (6)	3–0	Étoile Saint Laurent (7)
14.	Dernières Cartouches Carhaix (7)	0–4	Vannes OC (5)
15.	JA Penvénan (9)	0–2	AS Ginglin Cesson (6)
16.	FC Breteil-Talensac (6)	0–3	US Saint-Malo (4)
17.	CS Betton (7)	0–3	FC Beauregard Rennes (7)
18.	AS Vignoc-Hédé-Guipel (6)	0–0 (4–3 p)	Ploërmel FC (6)
19.	SC Le Rheu (7)	1–4	US Liffré (6)
20.	Espérance Chartres-de-Bretagne (6)	2–1	Entente Samsonnaise Doloise (6)
21.	US Saint-Gilles (8)	1–6	TA Rennes (5)
22.	US La Gacilly (7)	0–6	Dinan Léhon FC (4)
23.	FC Quiberon Saint-Pierre (10)	1–2	US Châteaugiron (8)
24.	US Saint-Carreuc-Hénon (8)	0–4	AS Vitré (5)
25.	CO Pacéen (7)	1–3	Keriolets de Pluvigner (6)
26.	US Fougères (5)	7–3	Lamballe FC (6)
27.	Avenir Lieuron (7)	2–3	AS Ménimur (6)
28.	FC Naizin (8)	0–2	Cercle Paul Bert Bréquigny (5)
29.	ES Plescop (7)	2–0	US Billé-Javène (8)
30.	Auray FC (7)	0–0 (4–5 p)	AC Rennes (8)

=== Sixth round ===
These matches were played on 28 and 29 October 2023.

Sixth round results: Brittany
Tie no	Home team (tier)	Score	Away team (tier)
1.	AS Ménimur (6)	0–5	US Saint-Malo (4)
2.	AS Ginglin Cesson (6)	1–1 (2–4 p)	Stade Briochin (4)
3.	Vannes OC (5)	1–1 (2–4 p)	GSI Pontivy (5)
4.	RC Ploumagoar (7)	1–2	Stade Pontivyen (5)
5.	Cercle Paul Bert Bréquigny (5)	1–4	PD Ergué-Gabéric (5)
6.	Stade Plabennécois (5)	3–1	Guipavas GdR (6)
7.	Keriolets de Pluvigner (6)	0–1	Dinan Léhon FC (4)
8.	AC Rennes (8)	0–1	US Châteaugiron (8)
9.	Plouhinec FC (7)	1–4	AS Vitré (5)
10.	FC Beauregard Rennes (7)	0–0 (2–3 p)	EA Saint-Renan (6)
11.	ES Plescop (7)	0–2	US Fougères (5)
12.	AS Vignoc-Hédé-Guipel (6)	0–3	Stade Paimpolais FC (7)
13.	Plougastel FC (6)	1–0	Loudéac OSC (6)
14.	US Liffré (6)	1–0	Espérance Chartres-de-Bretagne (6)
15.	AS Plobannalec-Lesconil (7)	1–3	TA Rennes (5)
