= 2025–26 Coupe de France preliminary rounds, Brittany =

The 2025–26 Coupe de France preliminary rounds, Brittany was the qualifying competition to decide which teams from the leagues of the Brittany region of France took part in the main competition from the seventh round.

A total of fifteen teams qualified from the Brittany preliminary rounds.

In 2024–25, Stade Briochin were the only team from the region to progress beyond the eighth round, making a deep run to the quarter final stage before being beaten 7–0 by eventual competition winners Paris Saint-Germain FC.

== Draws and fixtures ==
On 1 July 2025, the league published details of the teams from the region participating in the competition this season. The article and the list itself stated 669 teams, though the headline stated 681. The draw for the first round was published on 30 July 2025, with 252 fixtures drawn. The second round draw was published on 27 August 2025, with 194 fixtures drawn.

The third round draw was published on 3 September 2025. 113 ties were drawn, and the teams from Régional 1 and Championnat National 3 entered at this stage. The fourth round draw was published on 17 September 2025, featuring teams from Championnat National 2, and with 58 ties drawn. The fifth round draw, including the two teams from Championnat National, was made on 1 October 2025, with 30 ties drawn. The sixth round draw was published on 15 October 2025.

=== First round ===
These matches were played on 24 August 2025.

First round results: Brittany
Tie no	Home team (tier)	Score	Away team (tier)
1.	US Saint-Nicolas avec Tréal (11)	1–1 (6–7 p)	ES Quelneuc (11)
2.	Avenir du Goëlo (9)	2–3	Entente du Trieux FC (8)
3.	AS Ploumilliau (10)	0–2	US Trémel (10)
4.	FC Lizildry (12)	0–4	Stade Kénanais (11)
5.	AS Plestinaise (9)	0–2	JA Penvénan (9)
6.	ES Plougrasienne (10)	2–3	FC Trélévern-Trévou (11)
7.	US Pluzunet-Tonquédec (11)	6–1	CS Trégastel (11)
8.	UO Trégor (10)	1–4	US Ploubezre (9)
9.	ES Rudonou (10)	6–1	SC Trédarzec (10)
10.	US Méné Bré Louargat (10)	3–3 (3–0 p)	Méné Bré Sports Pédernec (10)
11.	AS Pleubian-Pleumeur (10)	0–1	Breizh Olympique Caouënnec-Lanvézéac (11)
12.	US Prat (10)	0–4	US Trieux-Lézardrieux-Pleudaniel (9)
13.	Union Squiffiec-Trégonneau (9)	0–4	CS Croix Lambert (9)
14.	Pléhédel Sport (10)	3–1	Saint-Brieuc Football Ouest (10)
15.	ES Frout Saint-Agathon (9)	6–1	US Goudelin (10)
16.	FC Gommenec'h (12)	1–4	ES Pommerit Le Merzer (9)
17.	AS Grâces (9)	1–1 (9–8 p)	AS Trégueux (8)
18.	AS Plélo (10)	2–3	US Plouisy (9)
19.	JS Lanvollon (9)	3–0	Goëlo FC (9)
20.	FC Lantic (10)	2–1	AS Pabu Plein Air (9)
21.	AS Hillion-Saint-René (9)	6–0	Saint-Brieuc Racing (10)
22.	UF Yffiniac (10)	5–0	AS Plouha Pludual (10)
23.	Yvias 90 FC (12)	0–3	Goëlands de Plouézec FC (10)
24.	AS Saint-Hervé (10)	3–0 (Note: Tie won by means of forfeit.)	Trieux FC (11)
25.	US Kergristoise (10)	1–3	Plounévez-Lanrivain-Trémargat US (10)
26.	US Maël-Carhaisienne (11)	2–9	ÉS Le Fœil (9)
27.	AS Pyramide Lanfains (11)	0–3	Rostrenen FC (8)
28.	AS Plenaltais Plaine-Haute (11)	0–5	FC La Croix-Corlay (9)
29.	US Plougonver (11)	1–2	FC Kreiz Breizh (10)
30.	US Callac (10)	3–1	ÉS La Madelene Saint-Guen (11)
31.	AS Trémuson (10)	0–0 (5–4 p)	Étoile du Leff Boqueho (9)
32.	ES Pestivien (10)	1–6	US Argoat-Pélem (10)
33.	ASL Saint-Julien (10)	1–1 (4–1 p)	FC Le Vieux Bourg (10)
34.	AS Kérien-Magoar (11)	3–0	FC Poulancre-Múr-Saint-Gilles (11)
35.	US Saint-Caradec (9)	1–4	Dahus du Mont Bel-Air (8)
36.	Gouessant Foot Coëtmieux-Andel-Morieux-Pommeret (9)	4–1	Association Trévé Sports (10)
37.	FC Centre Bretagne (9)	2–1	US Saint-Carreuc-Hénon (9)
38.	CS Illifaut (10)	0–2	ASC Hippocampe La Chèze (10)
39.	Mené FC (11)	1–3	CS Lanrelas (9)
40.	Étoile Sud Armor Porhoët (10)	5–2	US Trémorel (11)
41.	FC L'Hermitage Lorge (10)	0–1	AS Broons-Trémeur (9)
42.	AS Motterieux (9)	4–2	ASAC Hémonstoir (10)
43.	JS Allineuc (10)	3–0	FC Saint-Bugan (10)
44.	ALSL Plémy (10)	1–2	JS Landéhen (9)
45.	Stade Évrannais (9)	0–3	US Hunaudaye (9)
46.	FC Quévertois (10)	1–5	FC Beaussais-Rance-Frémur (8)
47.	ES Hénansal-Saint-Denoual-La Bouillie Emeraude (10)	1–1 (5–4 p)	US Lanvallay (9)
48.	US Calorguen (11)	2–2 (3–4 p)	US Yvignac-la-Tour (9)
49.	ES Mélorienne (10)	1–1 (6–5 p)	FC Côte de Penthièvre (9)
50.	FC Le Hinglé Trévron (10)	0–3	Stade Pleudihennais (8)
51.	AS Guitté Guenroc (10)	3–2	Val d'Arguenon Créhen-Pluduno (10)
52.	Taden SC (11)	0–5	FC Bourseul (10)
53.	Stade Plouërais (11)	0–6	Rance FC (10)
54.	Plancoët Arguenon FC (9)	0–1	US Frémur-Fresnaye (10)
55.	Rance Coëtquen Football (10)	1–1 (2–4 p)	ASC La Landec (11)
56.	ES Saint-Cast-le-Guildo (9)	6–0	US Plouasne-Saint-Juvat (9)
57.	US Querrien (11)	1–11	US Clohars-Carnoët (10)
58.	Locunolé Sports (11)	0–5	Stade Mellacois (10)
59.	AS Baye La Morena (10)	1–2	AS Tréméven (9)
60.	ES Rédené (10)	2–3	FC Aven-Bélon (9)
61.	ÉS Névez (10)	3–5	AS Melgven (9)
62.	AS Tourc'h (11)	1–6	Coquelicots du Trévoux (10)
63.	Mélénicks Elliant (9)	2–1	Glaziks de Coray (8)
64.	AS Kernével (10)	0–3	Gourin FC (9)
65.	FC Rosporden (10)	2–0	Paotred Briec (9)
66.	AC Carhaix (11)	0–7	ES Scrignac Poullaouen (10)
67.	Écureuils de Roudouallec (11)	1–3	US Kergloff (10)
68.	Toros Plounévézel (10)	1–1 (3–4 p)	Gars de Plonévez-du-Faou (9)
69.	US Châteauneuf-du-Faou (10)	2–1	US Landeleau (9)
70.	AS Pont-de-Buis (10)	0–3	Stade Pleybennois (9)
71.	US Lennon (10)	0–3	Saint-Thois Sports (9)
72.	AS Gâs de Leuhan (11)	0–4	US Cléden-Poher (10)
73.	Zèbres de Tregourez (11)	1–4	ES Langolen (10)
74.	Edern Sports (10)	0–3	FC Quimper Penhars (9)
75.	ES Gouézec (11)	6–0	SS Saint-Goazec (11)
76.	Gas du Menez-Hom (9)	1–3	FC Pen Hir Camaret (8)
77.	Lanvéoc Sports (10)	1–1 (4–5 p)	US Crozon-Morgat (9)
78.	Ar'Goliath FC (11)	0–4	Tricolores Landrévarzec (10)
79.	AS Telgruc-sur-Mer (11)	0–4	Racing Cast-Porzay (10)
80.	AS Diables du Juch (10)	1–2	US Quéménéven (9)
81.	AS Gars de Poullan (11)	3–2	Pouldergat Sport (10)
82.	FC Penn-ar-Bed (10)	0–2	Goulien Sports (9)
83.	AS Plouhinec (10)	0–3	ES Beuzec (9)
84.	Gas d'Ys Tréboul (10)	1–1 (5–4 p)	JS Plogastel (9)
85.	Lapins de Guengat (11)	3–4	ÉS Plonéis (10)
86.	ES Landudec-Guiler (10)	0–3	ES Mahalon-Confort (9)
87.	AS Loctudy (11)	4–3	Marcassins Sportif Tréogat (10)
88.	Gars de Plomeur (10)	0–3	FC Treffiagat-Guilvinec (9)
89.	FC Bigouden (10)	0–2	Plonéour FC (9)
90.	La Raquette Tréméoc (11)	0–3	US Pluguffan (9)
91.	Combrit Sainte-Marine FC (11)	0–9	FC Pleuvennois (9)
92.	FC Odet (9)	0–2	US Fouesnant (8)
93.	AS Saint-Yvi (10)	2–3	AS Plomelin (9)
94.	US Portugais Quimper (11)	2–3	Gourlizon Sport (9)
95.	La Guerlesquinaise (11)	0–6	Avenir Plourin (9)
96.	ES Berrien-Huelgoat (10)	0–3	ES Pleyber-Christ (9)
97.	ES Douron (10)	0–2	US Plouigneau (9)
98.	US Garlan (none)	0–3	AS Saint-Martin-des-Champs (9)
99.	FC Gars du Roc'h (11)	2–5	US Taulé (9)
100.	FC Sainte-Sève (11)	0–2	Étoile Trégoroise Plougasnou (9)
101.	US Lanmeur-Plouégat-Guérand (10)	2–2 (4–3 p)	ES Carantec-Henvic (9)
102.	Cadets de Plougoulm (11)	0–6	Stade Léonard Kreisker (9)
103.	FC Lanhouarneau-Plounévez-Lochrist (10)	0–2	Haut-Léon FC (9)
104.	US Saint-Servais-Saint-Derrien (11)	2–1	AS Saint-Vougay (11)
105.	AS Santec (10)	1–1 (4–2 p)	Paotred Rosko (9)
106.	FC des Enclos (10)	0–4	US Cléder (9)
107.	US Rochoise (10)	2–4	Stade Landernéen Kergrèis (8)
108.	Saint-Pierre Ploudiry-La Martyre (10)	3–4	US Pencran (9)
109.	JG Forestoise (11)	1–9	ES Cranou (9)
110.	AS Dirinon (10)	0–1	FC Le Relecq-Kerhuon (9)
111.	RC Loperhet (11)	0–2	FA de la Rade (9)
112.	VF Saint-Frégant (10)	0–7	FC Côte des Légendes (9)
113.	FC Le Drennec (11)	0–4	FC Plounéventer Plouédern (9)
114.	AS Kersaint (11)	0–1	Saint-Divy Sports (10)
115.	Hermine Kernilis (10)	1–5	Étoile Saint-Yves Ploudaniel (9)
116.	JS Saint-Thonanaise (11)	1–6	CND Le Folgoët (10)
117.	ÉS Guissenyenne (10)	0–1	AS Landeda (9)
118.	SC Lanrivoaré (10)	0–1	Gars Saint-Majan (8)
119.	JS Brest (11)	– (Note: Match did not take place due to JS Brest not completing the necessary pre-match preparations. The league penalised JS Brest and qualified AS Guilers for the next round.)	AS Guilers (9)
120.	Brest FC (11)	2–6	FC Lampaulais (9)
121.	US Aber-Benoît Tréglonou (11)	0–2	Avel Vor Saint-Pabu (10)
122.	ASC Mahoraise Brest (10)	0–0 (4–5 p)	US Plougonvelin (9)
123.	Légion Saint-Pierre (10)	0–2	ES Locmaria-Plouzané (9)
124.	AS Queliverzan (10)	2–2 (5–4 p)	Arzelliz Ploudalmézeau (9)
125.	AJA Bréles Lanildut (10)	2–0	Association Cavale Blanche Brest (10)
126.	AS Ploumoguer (10)	1–1 (3–1 p)	PL Pilier Rouge (9)
127.	AC Redonnais (10)	2–12	Avenir Lieuron (8)
128.	SC Luitré-Dompierre (12)	0–3	AS Livré/Mecé (10)
129.	US Saint-Méen-Saint-Onen (10)	1–0	Avenir Irodouër (8)
130.	US Gaël Muel (10)	0–6	Montfort-Iffendic (9)
131.	Maen Roch FC (9)	7–0	US Sens-de-Bretagne (10)
132.	US Sainte-Marie (10)	2–1	Réveil de Lohéac (9)
133.	Entente Sens-Vieux-Vy Gahard (9)	1–2	US Illet Forêt (8)
134.	Cercle Paul Bert Gayeulles (9)	2–5	FC Mordelles (8)
135.	Fougères FC (10)	1–1 (5–2 p)	US Saint-Marc/Saint-Ouen (9)
136.	JS Picanaise (10)	1–1 (6–7 p)	Jeunesse Combourgeoise (10)
137.	Rives Sportives du Couesnon (10)	3–0	ASE Lécousse (9)
138.	FC Plerguer Roz (10)	2–7	Combourg SC (9)
139.	FC Marcillé Bazouges Saint-Rémy Noyal (10)	1–1 (4–1 p)	AS Saint-Pierraise Épiniac (9)
140.	AS Romillé (10)	1–2	US Saint-Gilles (8)
141.	Avenir Domalain (10)	1–2	US Domagné-Saint-Didier (9)
142.	Celtik Brocéliande (11)	0–4	FC Pays d'Anast (9)
143.	Traon Kouenon FC (12)	0–5	FC Baie du Mont Saint-Michel (10)
144.	UFC Aron (10)	1–4	US Tertre Gris (9)
145.	US Bédée-Pleumeleuc (9)	1–1 (5–6 p)	Eskouadenn de Brocéliande (8)
146.	CS La Richardais (10)	2–2 (4–3 p)	La Mélorienne (9)
147.	Armaure FC (11)	2–7	FC Hermitage-Chapelle-Cintré (9)
148.	La Cancalaise (9)	1–0	Cercle Jules Ferry Saint-Malo (8)
149.	ES Visseiche Arbrissel (11)	0–0 (4–2 p)	Cadets Chelun Martigné-Ferchaud (9)
150.	Domloup Sport (10)	0–1	Cercle Paul Bert Villejean (9)
151.	US Pont-Péan (11)	0–1	AS Cheminots Rennais (9)
152.	ÉS Brie (10)	2–3	US Vern-sur-Seiche (9)
153.	ES Saint-Germain/Montours (9)	1–2	FC Louvigné-La Bazouge (8)
154.	US Saint-Armel (Ille-et-Vilaine) (10)	3–3 (4–5 p)	AS Melting Villejean (10)
155.	JS Boisgervilly (12)	0–1	US Médréac (10)
156.	Association Châtillon-en-Vendelais/Princé (10)	0–3	US Val d'Izé (9)
157.	AS La Gouesnière (10)	0–1	JA Saint-Servan (9)
158.	Pleurtuit Côte d'Emeraude (9)	1–2	AS Jacques Cartier (8)
159.	Hermine de Renac (10)	2–3	JA Pipriac (9)
160.	AS Ercé-près-Liffré (10)	0–2	ES Thorigné-Fouillard (9)
161.	FC Canton du Sel (10)	0–3	US Bain (9)
162.	AS Saint-Germain-du-Pinel (11)	0–3	Torcé-Vergéal FC (9)
163.	Entente Parigné/Landéan (10)	0–6	US Billé-Javené (9)
164.	Le Reveil Seglinois (11)	2–4	Espérance Sixt-sur-Aff (9)
165.	US La Baie La Fresnais (10)	2–2 (3–0 p)	US Baguer-Morvan (9)
166.	Haute Vilaine FC (10)	1–3	Jeunes d’Argentré (8)
167.	US Chanteloup (10)	1–1 (8–9 p)	US Janzé (9)
168.	Breizh Fobal Klub (11)	2–3	US Orgères (9)
169.	FC Grand-Fougeray Sainte-Anne (11)	1–2	Hermine La Noë Blanche (10)
170.	Stade Saint-Aubinais (8)	7–1 (Note: Tie reversed from original draw.)	US Dourdain (10)
171.	AS Parthenay-de-Bretagne (11)	0–4	FC La Mézière-Melesse (9)
172.	ASC Saint-Erblon (11)	2–4	SC Mahorais Rennes (10)
173.	SC Goven (11)	1–0	US Guignen (10)
174.	CS Betton (9)	1–0	US Gévezé (8)
175.	US Laillé (9)	3–2	US Bourgbarré (9)
176.	Hermine Erbrée Bréal Mondevert (10)	0–4	AS Étrelles (9)
177.	AS Chantepie (9)	0–3	Noyal-Brécé FC (8)
178.	AS Saint-Malo-de-Phily (11)	0–3	US Bel Air (9)
179.	AS Vezin-le-Coquet (11)	2–2 (3–4 p)	Espérance de Rennes (9)
180.	AS Montreuil-le-Gast (10)	1–1 (4–5 p)	FC La Chapelle-Montgermont (9)
181.	US Acigné (10)	0–3	Espérance La Bouëxière (8)
182.	CS Servon (9)	2–3	Ossé Saint-Aubin (8)
183.	La Seiche FC (10)	1–1 (4–5 p)	Stade Louvignéen (9)
184.	USC Chavagne (10)	0–2	JA Bréal (9)
185.	US Noyal-Chatillon (8)	6–2	OC Brétillien (10)
186.	AS Bubry (10)	3–2	FL Inguiniel (9)
187.	ES Le Croisty Saint-Caradec (11)	1–4	Pont-Scorff FA (10)
188.	Avenir du Pays Pourleth (10)	4–1	US Langoëlan-Ploërdut (10)
189.	AS Priziac (10)	1–3	FC Kerchopine (10)
190.	AS Calanaise (10)	3–0	ES Langonnet (11)
191.	US Berné (11)	0–5	FC Plouay (8)
192.	Avenir Guiscriff (9)	2–0	Stade Guémenois (9)
193.	FC Meslan (9)	1–2	Stiren Cléguer FC (9)
194.	JA Arzano (9)	0–0 (4–3 p)	ASC Kernascléden Lignol (10)
195.	AS Kergonan (11)	0–9	Stade Landévantais (10)
196.	Hermine Locoal-Mendon (10)	0–6	ES Merlevenez (10)
197.	AL Camors (9)	2–2 (3–4 p)	AS Pluvignoise (9)
198.	Landaul Sports (9)	7–1	Avenir Sainte-Hélène (10)
199.	FC Kerstel (10)	2–3	Stade Hennebontais (9)
200.	Fleur d'Ajonc Inzinzac (10)	5–1	Languidic FC (8)
201.	Entente Saint-Gilloise (11)	0–3	AS Guermeur (9)
202.	Riantec OC (10)	3–0	VFL Keryado Lorient (10)
203.	AS Lanester (10)	2–2 (2–3 p)	Stade Gavrais (10)
204.	ES Sud Outre Rade (10)	0–3	FOLC Lorient Ouest (9)
205.	Gueltas FC (10)	6–1	Saint-Gérand FC (10)
206.	ES Remungol (10)	4–1	Saint-Pierre Pleugriffet (10)
207.	Stade Gonnerien (11)	1–6	Garde Saint-Eloi Kerfourn (9)
208.	Garde du Gohazé Saint Thuriau (10)	0–2	FC Klegereg (8)
209.	AS Saint-Barthélemy (11)	0–8	Guénin Sport (9)
210.	Avenir Buléon-Lantillac (11)	2–3	Hermine Guernate (10)
211.	Melrand Sports (10)	1–5	US Moustoir-Remungol (10)
212.	US Rohannaise (9)	2–3	SC Sournais (9)
213.	Ajoncs d'Or Malguénac (9)	3–1	Saint-Clair Réguiny (10)
214.	Vigilante Radenac (10)	8–0	ACS Bieuzy-les-Eaux (11)
215.	Avenir Plumergat (10)	0–2	FC Quiberon Saint-Pierre (8)
216.	Erdeven-Étel Foot (10)	1–1 (2–3 p)	AS Turcs de l'Ouest (9)
217.	ASC Baden (10)	0–4	ES Mériadec (10)
218.	FC Mégalithes (9)	1–2	Semeurs de Grand-Champ (9)
219.	AS Meucon (10)	1–3	US Bieuzy-Lanvaux (10)
220.	AS Plougoumelen-Bono (8)	0–1	ASC Sainte-Anne-d'Auray (9)
221.	US Arradon (9)	1–4	US Ploeren (10)
222.	ES Crac'h (10)	0–1	Gazélec AC Morbihan (10)
223.	CS Pluneret (9)	2–2 (4–5 p)	AS Belle-Île-en-Mer (9)
224.	Cadets de Guéhenno (9)	1–5	ES Colpo (9)
225.	AS La Claie (10)	0–2	ES Larré-Molac (8)
226.	Ajoncs d'Or Saint-Nolff (9)	1–2	AS Moustoir-Ac (9)
227.	Rah-Koëd Plaudren FC (8)	2–0	AS Monterblanc (9)
228.	Garde du Loch (9)	3–2	EFC Saint-Jean-Brévelay (10)
229.	FC Entente de l'Oust (11)	0–1	US Le Cours (10)
230.	Paotred du Tarun (11)	1–5	Chevaliers Saint-Maurice Saint-Guyomard (9)
231.	Elan Montertelot (9)	2–0	Fondelienne Carentoir (9)
232.	Avenir Saint-Servant-sur-Oust (9)	0–4	Aurore de Taupont (8)
233.	CS Josselin (8)	1–2	AS Croix-Helléan (9)
234.	AS Cruguel (9)	4–0	Garde de Mi-Voie Guillac (10)
235.	OC Beignon (10)	1–3	Enfants de Saint-Gildas (10)
236.	Caro/Missiriac AS (10)	4–0	Garde de l'Yvel Loyat (11)
237.	Ecureils Roc-Saint-André (9)	2–2 (4–2 p)	Bleuets Néant-sur-Yvel (10)
238.	Avenir Campénéac Augan (9)	4–0	Glaneurs de Lizio (10)
239.	Saint-Hubert Sport Lanouée (10)	2–1	Avenir de Guilliers (10)
240.	FC Saint-Perreux (9)	0–4	AG Arzal (9)
241.	ES Cournon-Glénac (10)	2–4	JF Noyal-Muzillac (9)
242.	US Saint-Armel (Morbihan) (11)	0–4	Armoricaine Péaule (9)
243.	Etincelle Saint-Jean (10)	0–1	Les Fougerêts-Saint-Martin-sur-Oust (10)
244.	Gentienne Pluherlin (10)	4–3	AS Saint-Eloi La Vraie-Croix (10)
245.	US Albon Lauzach Berric Damgan (10)	0–4	CS Saint-Gaudence Allaire (9)
246.	Saint-Sébastien Caden (11)	1–2	La Patriote Malansac (9)
247.	Garde de la Vilaine Béganne (10)	1–6	Bogue D'Or Questembert (9)
248.	JA Peillac (9)	4–5	Saint-Clair Limerzel (9)
249.	ES Surzur (10)	3–0	Espoir Saint-Jacut-les-Pins (10)
250.	Plumelin Sports (9)	4–2	AS Saint-Jean-Brévelay (10)
251.	La Sérentaise (10)	4–1	La Mélécienne de Plumelec (9)
252.	Garde Saint-Arnould Saint-Allouestre (11)	0–1	FC Billio (11)

=== Second round ===
These matches were played on 31 August 2025.

Second round results: Brittany
Tie no	Home team (tier)	Score	Away team (tier)
1.	FC Kerchopine (10)	3–1	Garde Saint-Eloi Kerfourn (9)
2.	SC Sournais (9)	0–3	Garde Saint-Cyr Moréac (7)
3.	Stiren Cléguer FC (9)	4–2 (Note: Tie reversed from original draw.)	FC Plouay (8)
4.	JA Arzano (9)	3–5	Ajoncs d'Or Malguénac (9)
5.	US Moustoir-Remungol (10)	1–3	Moutons Blanc de Noyal-Pontivy (8)
6.	Avenir Guiscriff (9)	1–0	AS Calanaise (10)
7.	FC Klegereg (8)	2–0	CS Pluméliau (8)
8.	Fleur d'Ajonc Inzinzac (10)	5–0	Avenir du Pays Pourleth (10)
9.	Hermine Guernate (10)	1–5	FC Naizin (8)
10.	ES Remungol (10)	1–0	AS Bubry (10)
11.	Guénin Sport (9)	3–1	Gueltas FC (10)
12.	Stade Landévantais (10)	1–3	Saint-Efflam Kervignac (8)
13.	Riantec OC (10)	0–1	FC Quiberon Saint-Pierre (8)
14.	Stade Hennebontais (9)	1–3	Stade Gavrais (10)
15.	ES Ploemel (8)	2–2 (2–1 p)	CS Quéven (7)
16.	FC Bélugas Ria (8)	0–4	Plouhinec FC (7)
17.	AS Guermeur (9)	2–2 (5–3 p)	US Goëlands de Larmor-Plage (8)
18.	AS Belle-Île-en-Mer (9)	6–4	Pont-Scorff FA (10)
19.	Lorient Sports (8)	0–6	Caudan SF (9)
20.	ES Merlevenez (10)	2–1	FC Ploemeur (7)
21.	FOLC Lorient Ouest (9)	0–7	La Guideloise (8)
22.	ASC Sainte-Anne-d'Auray (9)	4–1	ES Mériadec (10)
23.	US Bieuzy-Lanvaux (10)	1–4	AS Ménimur (7)
24.	Plumelin Sports (9)	1–2	Elvinoise Foot (7)
25.	ES Saint-Avé (8)	3–0	Rah-Koëd Plaudren FC (8)
26.	AS Turcs de l'Ouest (9)	2–1	Garde du Loch (9)
27.	ES Colpo (9)	3–3 (5–4 p)	Semeurs de Grand-Champ (9)
28.	Landaul Sports (9)	1–2	ES Plescop (7)
29.	AS Moustoir-Ac (9)	1–1 (8–7 p)	US Ploeren (10)
30.	AS Pluvignoise (9)	0–8	US Brech (8)
31.	Gazélec AC Morbihan (10)	0–14	Baud FC (8)
32.	FC Billio (11)	1–7	AS Croix-Helléan (9)
33.	Saint-Hubert Sport Lanouée (10)	2–11	CS Bignan (7)
34.	ES Quelneuc (11)	0–10	Espérance Bréhan (7)
35.	Ecureils Roc-Saint-André (9)	0–4	US La Gacilly (8)
36.	AS Cruguel (9)	1–0	Ruffiac-Malestroit (7)
37.	Aurore de Taupont (8)	2–6	Enfants de Guer (8)
38.	Enfants de Saint-Gildas (10)	1–4	US Saint-Abraham Chapelle-Caro (8)
39.	Indépendante Mauronnaise (8)	1–0	Elan Montertelot (9)
40.	Caro/Missiriac AS (10)	2–1	La Sérentaise (10)
41.	Avenir Campénéac Augan (9)	1–0	Vigilante Radenac (10)
42.	ES Larré-Molac (8)	1–3	Avenir Theix (8)
43.	JF Noyal-Muzillac (9)	1–4	Muzillac OS (8)
44.	Armoricaine Péaule (9)	1–2	Montagnards Sulniac (8)
45.	ES Surzur (10)	0–3	FC Basse Vilaine (8)
46.	CS Saint-Gaudence Allaire (9)	6–1	Chevaliers Saint-Maurice Saint-Guyomard (9)
47.	Saint-Clair Limerzel (9)	2–4	US Saint-Melaine Rieux (8)
48.	AG Arzal (9)	2–3	Garde du Pont Marzan (8)
49.	Les Fougerêts-Saint-Martin-sur-Oust (10)	3–0	La Patriote Malansac (9)
50.	US Le Cours (10)	1–1 (2–4 p)	Sarzeau FC (8)
51.	Bogue D'Or Questembert (9)	4–0	Gentienne Pluherlin (10)
52.	US Plouisy (9)	0–6	CS Bégard (8)
53.	CS Plédran (8)	4–0	FC Lié (8)
54.	CS Croix Lambert (9)	0–0 (4–2 p)	Étoile Sud Armor Porhoët (10)
55.	RC Dinan (8)	1–0	US Erquy (8)
56.	AS Guitté Guenroc (10)	0–3	AS Trélivan (8)
57.	US Yvignac-la-Tour (9)	2–1	ES Hénansal-Saint-Denoual-La Bouillie Emeraude (10)
58.	ES Frout Saint-Agathon (9)	1–0	FC Lantic (10)
59.	AS Trémuson (10)	1–2	Saint-Brandan-Quintin FC (7)
60.	Stade Pleudihennais (8)	1–0	JS Landéhen (9)
61.	FC Centre Bretagne (9)	0–0 (3–4 p)	Ploufragan FC (7)
62.	FC Kreiz Breizh (10)	1–3	ÉS Le Fœil (9)
63.	AS Kérien-Magoar (11)	0–5	ES Pommerit Le Merzer (9)
64.	ASC La Landec (11)	1–4	Dahus du Mont Bel-Air (8)
65.	FC Beaussais-Rance-Frémur (8)	1–3	Évron FC (7)
66.	ES Saint-Cast-le-Guildo (9)	6–0	US Frémur-Fresnaye (10)
67.	AS Broons-Trémeur (9)	2–2 (1–4 p)	ES Mélorienne (10)
68.	Plounévez-Lanrivain-Trémargat US (10)	1–6	FC Plouagat-Châtelaudren-Lanrodec (8)
69.	AS Saint-Hervé (10)	0–3	FC Moncontour-Trédaniel (8)
70.	US Argoat-Pélem (10)	2–2 (6–7 p)	JS Allineuc (10)
71.	Loudéac OSC (7)	3–1	Plérin FC (8)
72.	AS Motterieux (9)	1–1 (7–6 p)	UF Yffiniac (10)
73.	AS Hillion-Saint-René (9)	4–4 (4–2 p)	CS Merdrignac (8)
74.	Gouessant Foot Coëtmieux-Andel-Morieux-Pommeret (9)	0–1	AS Uzel-Merléac (8)
75.	ASL Saint-Julien (10)	3–0	La Ploeucoise Foot (8)
76.	Pléhédel Sport (10)	2–1	US Méné Bré Louargat (10)
77.	FC Trélévern-Trévou (11)	5–1	US Pluzunet-Tonquédec (11)
78.	JA Penvénan (9)	2–2 (3–4 p)	FC Trébeurden-Pleumeur-Bodou (8)
79.	Stade Kénanais (11)	0–8	US Trieux-Lézardrieux-Pleudaniel (9)
80.	US Trémel (10)	0–5	US Perros-Louannec (8)
81.	Entente du Trieux FC (8)	4–1	AS Servel-Lannion (8)
82.	Goëlands de Plouézec FC (10)	1–4	Trégor FC (8)
83.	Stade Paimpolais FC (7)	2–3	JS Cavan (7)
84.	Breizh Olympique Caouënnec-Lanvézéac (11)	0–5	CS Rospez (8)
85.	US Ploubezre (9)	3–2	ES Rudonou (10)
86.	JS Lanvollon (9)	0–0 (5–6 p)	RC Ploumagoar (7)
87.	US Hunaudaye (9)	1–2	Les Vallées FC (8)
88.	FC La Croix-Corlay (9)	2–2 (2–4 p)	Rostrenen FC (8)
89.	Rance FC (10)	1–1 (4–5 p)	FC Plélan Vildé Corseul (8)
90.	CS Lanrelas (9)	2–0	FC Bourseul (10)
91.	US Callac (10)	0–1	AS Grâces (9)
92.	Pordic-Binic FC (8)	8–0	US Briacine (8)
93.	ASC Hippocampe La Chèze (10)	1–7	Plaintel SF (7)
94.	AS Ploumoguer (10)	0–5	ES Portsall Kersaint (7)
95.	AS Queliverzan (10)	2–3	Espérance Plouguerneau (8)
96.	AS Landéda (9)	5–1	AJA Bréles Lanildut (10)
97.	FC Lampaulais (9)	1–0	Gars Saint-Majan (8)
98.	US Plougonvelin (9)	0–4	Étoile Saint Laurent (7)
99.	AS Guilers (9)	0–4	SC Lannilis (8)
100.	CND Le Folgoët (10)	4–2	FC Gouesnou (8)
101.	FC Le Relecq-Kerhuon (9)	0–0 (3–4 p)	ES Locmaria-Plouzané (9)
102.	Plouzané AC (7)	1–1 (6–7 p)	Vie au Grand Air Bohars (8)
103.	Saint-Divy Sports (10)	1–5	ASPTT Brest (8)
104.	Gars de Saint-Yves (7)	1–1 (2–4 p)	AL Coataudon (8)
105.	US Saint-Servais-Saint-Derrien (11)	0–4	US Taulé (9)
106.	Stade Landernéen Kergrèis (8)	0–2	AS Plouvien (7)
107.	Stade Léonard Kreisker (9)	4–0	ES Pleyber-Christ (9)
108.	US Plouigneau (9)	1–0	Guiclan Plouénan FC (8)
109.	Étoile Trégoroise Plougasnou (9)	3–0	AS Santec (10)
110.	Haut-Léon FC (9)	1–1 (3–1 p)	ES Saint-Thégonnec (8)
111.	FC Plounéventer Plouédern (9)	0–2	ÉF Plougourvest (9)
112.	FC Côte des Légendes (9)	2–1	AS Saint-Martin-des-Champs (9)
113.	Avenir Plourin (9)	0–6	Guipavas GdR (7)
114.	US Lanmeur-Plouégat-Guérand (10)	0–1	Landi FC (8)
115.	US Cléder (9)	2–0	AS Brest (7)
116.	RC Lesnevien (8)	1–0	Saint-Pierre Plouescat (8)
117.	SC Morlaix (7)	1–0	AS Sizun-Le Tréhou (7)
118.	Landerneau FC (7)	1–1 (4–5 p)	JU Plougonven (8)
119.	ES Mignonne (9)	2–1	ES Plogonnec (8)
120.	ES Cranou (9)	5–0	Racing Cast-Porzay (10)
121.	ES Scrignac Poullaouen (10)	0–3	Dernières Cartouches Carhaix (8)
122.	US Crozon-Morgat (9)	1–3	FA de la Rade (9)
123.	Stade Pleybennois (9)	2–1	US Pencran (9)
124.	US Kergloff (10)	2–2 (5–6 p)	ES Gouézec (11)
125.	Saint-Thois Sports (9)	3–1	US Quéménéven (9)
126.	FC Pen Hir Camaret (8)	6–1	Châteaulin FC (8)
127.	Gars de Plonévez-du-Faou (9)	0–5	US Châteauneuf-du-Faou (10)
128.	AS Loctudy (11)	0–10	Gourlizon Sport (9)
129.	Tricolores Landrévarzec (10)	3–1	AS Gars de Poullan (11)
130.	Gas d'Ys Tréboul (10)	0–0 (4–1 p)	Cormorans Sportif de Penmarc'h (8)
131.	ES Mahalon-Confort (9)	0–1	La Plozévetienne (8)
132.	Quimper Ergué-Armel FC (7)	2–1	Quimper Kerfeunteun FC (7)
133.	FC Quimper Penhars (9)	3–1	Amicale Italia Bretagne (8)
134.	Goulien Sports (9)	0–2	Stella Maris Douarnenez (7)
135.	Plonéour FC (9)	3–0	Espoir Clohars Fouesnant (8)
136.	US Pluguffan (9)	2–0	ÉS Plonéis (10)
137.	AS Plomelin (9)	0–4	ES Beuzec (9)
138.	FC Treffiagat-Guilvinec (9)	0–1	US Saint-Évarzec (8)
139.	FC Pont-l'Abbé (7)	3–1	AS Plobannalec-Lesconil (7)
150.	Stade Mellacois (10)	0–3	US Trégunc (7)
141.	US Clohars-Carnoët (10)	1–4	EA Scaër (7)
142.	US Cléden-Poher (10)	0–3	CA Forestois (8)
143.	Fleur de Genêt Bannalec (8)	1–2	Hermine Concarnoise (8)
144.	FC Aven-Bélon (9)	4–0	ES Langolen (10)
145.	FC Rosporden (10)	1–2	Amicale Ergué-Gabéric (7)
146.	AS Tréméven (9)	0–4	AS Melgven (9)
147.	Coquelicots du Trévoux (10)	0–3	PB Spézet (8)
148.	Gourin FC (9)	0–4	Stade Quimperlois (8)
149.	US Fouesnant (8)	3–1	US Moëlan (8)
150.	FC Pleuvennois (9)	1–1 (3–4 p)	Mélénicks Elliant (9)
151.	Étoile Saint-Yves Ploudaniel (9)	3–0	Avel Vor Saint-Pabu (10)
152.	Jeunes d’Argentré (8)	4–3	Torcé-Vergéal FC (9)
153.	Combourg SC (9)	4–0	US Saint-Jouan-des-Guérets (7)
154.	Bocage FC (7)	1–2	JA Balazé (8)
155.	AS Étrelles (9)	1–5	RC Rannée-La Guerche-Drouges (7)
156.	US Janzé (9)	1–1 (5–3 p)	AS Retiers-Coësmes (8)
157.	US Grégorienne (7)	4–1	AC Rennes (8)
158.	AS Melting Villejean (10)	0–2	Noyal-Brécé FC (8)
159.	Stade Saint-Aubinais (8)	7–0	US Val d'Izé (9)
160.	Espérance de Rennes (9)	0–2	CO Pacéen (7)
161.	Jeunesse Combourgeoise (10)	1–3	FC La Chapelle-Montgermont (9)
162.	SC Le Rheu (7)	1–2	AS Cheminots Rennais (9)
163.	FC Marcillé Bazouges Saint-Rémy Noyal (10)	1–5	US Illet Forêt (8)
164.	FC Baie du Mont Saint-Michel (10)	3–4	US Château-Malo (8)
165.	FC La Mézière-Melesse (9)	1–1 (5–4 p)	Entente Samsonnaise Doloise (7)
166.	US Billé-Javené (9)	2–5	FC Louvigné-La Bazouge (8)
167.	JA Bréal (9)	1–5	FC Breteil-Talensac (7)
168.	US La Baie La Fresnais (10)	2–4	AS Jacques Cartier (8)
169.	SC Goven (11)	0–2	JA Pipriac (9)
170.	JA Saint-Servan (9)	0–8	FC Dinardais (7)
171.	Ossé Saint-Aubin (8)	1–1 (4–3 p)	US Vern-sur-Seiche (9)
172.	AS Livré/Mecé (10)	0–2	Espérance La Bouëxière (8)
173.	SEP Quédillac (8)	0–2	FC Tinténiac-Saint-Domineuc (7)
174.	US Domagné-Saint-Didier (9)	1–0	US Châteaugiron (7)
175.	ES Visseiche Arbrissel (11)	2–5	Bleuets Le Pertre-Brielles-Gennes-Saint-Cyr (8)
176.	Hermine La Noë Blanche (10)	1–3	Avenir Lieuron (8)
177.	Espérance Chartres-de-Bretagne (7)	0–4	FC Mordelles (8)
178.	US Orgères (9)	4–0	US Bel Air (9)
179.	Rives Sportives du Couesnon (10)	0–6	US Gosné (8)
180.	Maen Roch FC (9)	0–3	AS Miniac-Morvan (7)
181.	Eskouadenn de Brocéliande (8)	0–1	FC Pays d'Anast (9)
182.	US Médréac (10)	1–3	US Saint-Gilles (8)
183.	Montfort-Iffendic (9)	1–5	OC Montauban (7)
184.	ES Thorigné-Fouillard (9)	0–5	FC Aubinois (7)
185.	La Cancalaise (9)	1–1 (4–5 p)	CS La Richardais (10)
186.	Cercle Paul Bert Villejean (9)	2–6	FC Bruz (7)
187.	US Tertre Gris (9)	0–5	FC Guichen (7)
188.	US Noyal-Chatillon (8)	1–0	US Laillé (9)
189.	FC Guipry-Messac (8)	3–1	US Bain (9)
190.	CS Betton (9)	2–0	SC Mahorais Rennes (10)
191.	Fougères FC (10)	3–2	ASC Romagné (8)
192.	Stade Louvignéen (9)	0–3	La Vitréenne FC (8)
193.	FC Hermitage-Chapelle-Cintré (9)	1–2	US Saint-Méen-Saint-Onen (10)
194.	Espérance Sixt-sur-Aff (9)	3–1	US Sainte-Marie (10)

=== Third round ===
These matches were played on 13 and 14 September 2025.

Third round results: Brittany
Tie no	Home team (tier)	Score	Away team (tier)
1.	ES Cranou (9)	1–1 (7–6 p)	Amicale Ergué-Gabéric (7)
2.	FA de la Rade (9)	0–4	SC Morlaix (7)
3.	FC Lampaulais (9)	0–2	Saint-Pierre de Milizac (5)
4.	CND Le Folgoët (10)	1–2	Étoile Saint-Yves Ploudaniel (9)
5.	Vie au Grand Air Bohars (8)	5–1	FC Côte des Légendes (9)
6.	ES Locmaria-Plouzané (9)	2–2 (5–3 p)	Haut-Léon FC (9)
7.	Espérance Plouguerneau (8)	0–1	AS Plouvien (7)
8.	US Taulé (9)	1–2	EA Saint-Renan (6)
9.	ÉF Plougourvest (9)	0–2	Stade Léonard Kreisker (9)
10.	ASPTT Brest (8)	2–4	Étoile Trégoroise Plougasnou (9)
11.	RC Lesnevien (8)	4–0	AS Landeda (9)
12.	US Cléder (9)	4–2	ES Portsall Kersaint (7)
13.	US Pluguffan (9)	0–5	PD Ergué-Gabéric (5)
14.	EA Scaër (7)	3–1	CA Forestois (8)
15.	Stade Quimperlois (8)	2–2 (5–4 p)	US Trégunc (7)
16.	Dernières Cartouches Carhaix (8)	2–2 (5–3 p)	Stella Maris Douarnenez (7)
17.	US Saint-Évarzec (8)	2–1	FC Pont-l'Abbé (7)
18.	Gourlizon Sport (9)	0–0 (4–3 p)	Quimper Ergué-Armel FC (7)
19.	La Plozévetienne (8)	2–1	Mélénicks Elliant (9)
20.	US Fouesnant (8)	1–3	Plonéour FC (9)
21.	FC Quimper Penhars (9)	2–6	FC Pen Hir Camaret (8)
22.	Gas d'Ys Tréboul (10)	0–2	Hermine Concarnoise (8)
23.	AS Melgven (9)	2–0	ES Beuzec (9)
24.	PB Spézet (8)	1–5	Stade Plabennécois (6)
25.	FC Aven-Bélon (9)	0–5	Plougastel FC (6)
26.	Saint-Thois Sports (9)	0–2	ES Mignonne (9)
27.	Tricolores Landrévarzec (10)	0–7	Landi FC (8)
28.	ES Gouézec (11)	0–7	Guipavas GdR (7)
29.	US Châteauneuf-du-Faou (10)	0–2	US Plouigneau (9)
30.	AL Coataudon (8)	1–4	Stade Pleybennois (9)
31.	JU Plougonven (8)	1–1 (3–5 p)	AG Plouvorn (6)
32.	SC Lannilis (8)	1–3	Étoile Saint Laurent (7)
33.	AS Cruguel (9)	1–1 (4–2 p)	ES Plescop (7)
34.	Avenir Theix (8)	1–4	Ploërmel FC (6)
35.	ES Merlevenez (10)	1–1 (6–7 p)	Indépendante Mauronnaise (8)
36.	Caudan SF (9)	3–1	AS Croix-Helléan (9)
37.	Enfants de Guer (8)	8–1	Sarzeau FC (8)
38.	US La Gacilly (8)	1–0	Espérance Bréhan (7)
39.	ES Remungol (10)	1–2	US Saint-Abraham Chapelle-Caro (8)
40.	US Brech (8)	6–0	Avenir Campénéac Augan (9)
41.	AS Guermeur (9)	4–0	Caro/Missiriac AS (10)
42.	Saint-Efflam Kervignac (8)	0–5	Keriolets de Pluvigner (6)
43.	Baud FC (8)	2–0	FC Basse Vilaine (8)
44.	Elvinoise Foot (7)	1–2	Plouhinec FC (7)
45.	Garde du Pont Marzan (8)	2–2 (4–5 p)	CEP Lorient (6)
46.	CS Bignan (7)	3–0	FC Quiberon Saint-Pierre (8)
47.	ASC Sainte-Anne-d'Auray (9)	1–3	Avenir Guiscriff (9)
48.	US Saint-Melaine Rieux (8)	1–1 (4–3 p)	FC Naizin (8)
49.	Fleur d'Ajonc Inzinzac (10)	4–4 (2–4 p)	Muzillac OS (8)
50.	Ajoncs d'Or Malguénac (9)	1–3	Vannes OC (5)
51.	FC Klegereg (8)	1–5	Séné FC (6)
52.	Montagnards Sulniac (8)	0–7	Stade Pontivyen (6)
53.	Stiren Cléguer FC (9)	1–1 (1–4 p)	Bogue D'Or Questembert (9)
54.	AS Turcs de l'Ouest (9)	0–4	ES Saint-Avé (8)
55.	FC Kerchopine (10)	1–11	Garde Saint-Cyr Moréac (7)
56.	Guénin Sport (9)	1–5	CS Saint-Gaudence Allaire (9)
57.	Les Fougerêts-Saint-Martin-sur-Oust (10)	0–2	ES Ploemel (8)
58.	Moutons Blanc de Noyal-Pontivy (8)	3–0	ES Colpo (9)
59.	AS Ménimur (7)	0–4	US Montagnarde (6)
60.	Stade Gavrais (10)	1–7	La Guideloise (8)
61.	AS Moustoir-Ac (9)	1–4	Auray FC (6)
62.	AS Belle-Île-en-Mer (9)	0–6	GSI Pontivy (5)
63.	US Saint-Gilles (8)	1–1 (6–5 p)	Espérance Sixt-sur-Aff (9)
64.	US Noyal-Chatillon (8)	1–1 (4–2 p)	US Domagné-Saint-Didier (9)
65.	OC Cesson (5)	0–2	AS Saint-Jacques (6)
66.	Bleuets Le Pertre-Brielles-Gennes-Saint-Cyr (8)	4–1	AS Cheminots Rennais (9)
67.	RC Rannée-La Guerche-Drouges (7)	3–1	Avenir Lieuron (8)
68.	FC Bruz (7)	1–2	Cadets de Bains (6)
69.	FC Pays d'Anast (9)	0–4	FC Breteil-Talensac (7)
70.	FC Louvigné-La Bazouge (8)	2–3	Stade Saint-Aubinais (8)
71.	FC La Mézière-Melesse (9)	1–0	Fougères FC (10)
72.	US Illet Forêt (8)	0–2	US Fougères (5)
73.	JA Balazé (8)	0–3	AS Vitré (5)
74.	FC Mordelles (8)	2–0	Ossé Saint-Aubin (8)
75.	US Orgères (9)	2–1	CO Pacéen (7)
76.	JA Pipriac (9)	1–7	Stade Castelbourgeois FC (6)
77.	FC Guichen (7)	1–1 (14–13 p)	FC Guipry-Messac (8)
78.	US Saint-Méen-Saint-Onen (10)	1–1 (2–4 p)	Jeunes d’Argentré (8)
79.	La Vitréenne FC (8)	3–5	FC Aubinois (7)
80.	Combourg SC (9)	1–2	AS Vignoc-Hédé-Guipel (6)
81.	US Liffré (6)	0–0 (4–3 p)	US Grégorienne (7)
82.	US Gosné (8)	1–4	FC Dinardais (7)
83.	OC Montauban (7)	0–3	TA Rennes (6)
84.	FC La Chapelle-Montgermont (9)	1–1 (3–2 p) (Note: Tie reversed from original draw.)	CS Betton (9)
85.	US Château-Malo (8)	1–0	FC Tinténiac-Saint-Domineuc (7)
86.	Noyal-Brécé FC (8)	0–3	Cercle Paul Bert Bréquigny (6)
87.	CS La Richardais (10)	2–1	AS Jacques Cartier (8)
88.	AS Miniac-Morvan (7)	1–0	Espérance La Bouëxière (8)
89.	US Janzé (9)	1–5	FC Atlantique Vilaine (6)
90.	ES Pommerit Le Merzer (9)	4–1	ÉS Le Fœil (9)
91.	ASL Saint-Julien (10)	1–6	CO Briochin Sportif Ploufraganais (6)
92.	FC Trébeurden-Pleumeur-Bodou (8)	4–1	Entente du Trieux FC (8)
93.	FC Trélévern-Trévou (11)	0–5	AS Ginglin Cesson (6)
94.	Pléhédel Sport (10)	2–2 (4–2 p)	US Ploubezre (9)
95.	JS Cavan (7)	0–2	Lannion FC (5)
96.	US Perros-Louannec (8)	5–0	US Trieux-Lézardrieux-Pleudaniel (9)
97.	Trégor FC (8)	2–5	Saint-Brandan-Quintin FC (7)
98.	CS Rospez (8)	0–0 (3–4 p)	CS Bégard (8)
99.	RC Ploumagoar (7)	2–0	FC Plouagat-Châtelaudren-Lanrodec (8)
100.	AS Grâces (9)	1–2	Rostrenen FC (8)
101.	ES Frout Saint-Agathon (9)	4–2	Pordic-Binic FC (8)
102.	AS Motterieux (9)	1–4	CS Croix Lambert (9)
103.	Dahus du Mont Bel-Air (8)	1–3	RC Dinan (8)
104.	CS Plédran (8)	4–0	AS Hillion-Saint-René (9)
105.	AS Uzel-Merléac (8)	2–2 (5–6 p)	ES Saint-Cast-le-Guildo (9)
106.	FC Plélan Vildé Corseul (8)	1–1 (3–1 p)	Ploufragan FC (7)
107.	JS Allineuc (10)	2–1	ES Mélorienne (10)
108.	Plaintel SF (7)	4–2	Lamballe FC (6)
109.	AS Trélivan (8)	2–2 (0–3 p)	US Langueux (6)
110.	FC Moncontour-Trédaniel (8)	1–3	US Quessoy (6)
111.	Les Vallées FC (8)	2–4	Loudéac OSC (7)
112.	Évron FC (7)	0–1	Stade Pleudihennais (8)
113.	CS Lanrelas (9)	4–0	US Yvignac-la-Tour (9)

=== Fourth round ===
These matches were played on 27 and 28 September 2025.

Fourth round results: Brittany
Tie no	Home team (tier)	Score	Away team (tier)
1.	CO Briochin Sportif Ploufraganais (6)	1–1 (2–4 p)	Guipavas GdR (7)
2.	Étoile Saint Laurent (7)	0–4	AG Plouvorn (6)
3.	Rostrenen FC (8)	2–0	Étoile Trégoroise Plougasnou (9)
4.	CS Bégard (8)	1–1 (3–5 p)	Plougastel FC (6)
5.	FC Trébeurden-Pleumeur-Bodou (8)	0–3	Saint-Pierre de Milizac (5)
6.	ES Mignonne (9)	2–1	RC Ploumagoar (7)
7.	ES Locmaria-Plouzané (9)	1–2	US Cléder (9)
8.	Stade Léonard Kreisker (9)	0–1	Vie au Grand Air Bohars (8)
9.	RC Lesnevien (8)	1–3	AS Ginglin Cesson (6)
10.	US Perros-Louannec (8)	1–4	EA Saint-Renan (6)
11.	Étoile Saint-Yves Ploudaniel (9)	1–2	FC Pen Hir Camaret (8)
12.	SC Morlaix (7)	0–1	Stade Plabennécois (6)
13.	Landi FC (8)	3–4	US Plouigneau (9)
14.	ES Pommerit Le Merzer (9)	0–4	AS Plouvien (7)
15.	ES Frout Saint-Agathon (9)	3–2	Lannion FC (5)
16.	Saint-Brandan-Quintin FC (7)	2–2 (0–3 p)	Plaintel SF (7)
17.	Stade Saint-Aubinais (8)	0–2	FC Aubinois (7)
18.	CS Lanrelas (9)	0–4	Dinan Léhon FC (4)
19.	Pléhédel Sport (10)	1–8	US Liffré (6)
20.	CS La Richardais (10)	0–3	US Fougères (5)
21.	US Château-Malo (8)	0–0 (4–3 p)	TA Rennes (6)
22.	FC Dinardais (7)	6–1	US Saint-Gilles (8)
23.	Jeunes d’Argentré (8)	1–1 (4–5 p)	ES Saint-Cast-le-Guildo (9)
24.	JS Allineuc (10)	1–3	Stade Pleudihennais (8)
25.	Cercle Paul Bert Bréquigny (6)	4–4 (4–2 p)	US Quessoy (6)
26.	AS Vignoc-Hédé-Guipel (6)	5–0	AS Miniac-Morvan (7)
27.	Bleuets Le Pertre-Brielles-Gennes-Saint-Cyr (8)	2–0	US Langueux (6)
28.	CS Croix Lambert (9)	3–6	RC Dinan (8)
29.	CS Plédran (8)	2–1	FC Plélan Vildé Corseul (8)
30.	AS Guermeur (9)	0–5	US Montagnarde (6)
31.	GSI Pontivy (5)	3–0	Auray FC (6)
32.	Avenir Guiscriff (9)	0–4	Dernières Cartouches Carhaix (8)
33.	ES Ploemel (8)	0–5	PD Ergué-Gabéric (5)
34.	Stade Pleybennois (9)	3–0	La Plozévetienne (8)
35.	AS Melgven (9)	1–6	EA Scaër (7)
36.	CS Bignan (7)	0–2	Baud FC (8)
37.	La Guideloise (8)	0–4	Stade Quimperlois (8)
38.	Garde Saint-Cyr Moréac (7)	1–3	Saint-Colomban Sportive Locminé (4)
39.	Gourlizon Sport (9)	0–2	Stade Pontivyen (6)
40.	Caudan SF (9)	1–3	CEP Lorient (6)
41.	Plonéour FC (9)	2–1	Plouhinec FC (7)
42.	Hermine Concarnoise (8)	4–2	US Saint-Évarzec (8)
43.	US Brech (8)	0–3	Séné FC (6)
44.	ES Cranou (9)	1–6	Keriolets de Pluvigner (6)
45.	Bogue D'Or Questembert (9)	1–3	AS Saint-Jacques (6)
46.	FC La Mézière-Melesse (9)	0–7	Enfants de Guer (8)
47.	Muzillac OS (8)	2–1	AS Cruguel (9)
48.	US Saint-Melaine Rieux (8)	0–5	Stade Castelbourgeois FC (6)
49.	Moutons Blanc de Noyal-Pontivy (8)	0–0 (4–2 p)	FC Atlantique Vilaine (6)
50.	FC Breteil-Talensac (7)	3–0	RC Rannée-La Guerche-Drouges (7)
51.	Cadets de Bains (6)	1–0	ES Saint-Avé (8)
52.	US La Gacilly (8)	1–1 (3–4 p)	FC La Chapelle-Montgermont (9)
53.	US Orgères (9)	0–3	FC Guichen (7)
54.	Indépendante Mauronnaise (8)	0–1	Ploërmel FC (6)
55.	FC Mordelles (8)	0–2	AS Vitré (5)
56.	US Saint-Abraham Chapelle-Caro (8)	0–6	Vannes OC (5)
57.	Loudéac OSC (7)	6–1	US Noyal-Chatillon (8)
58.	CS Saint-Gaudence Allaire (9)	0–9	US Saint-Malo (4)

=== Fifth round ===
These matches were played on 11 and 12 October 2025.

Fifth round results: Brittany
Tie no	Home team (tier)	Score	Away team (tier)
1.	Rostrenen FC (8)	0–5	AG Plouvorn (6)
2.	US Plouigneau (9)	0–3	US Cléder (9)
3.	Stade Quimperlois (8)	3–0	ES Mignonne (9)
4.	FC Pen Hir Camaret (8)	2–0	Plonéour FC (9)
5.	AS Plouvien (7)	2–0	EA Scaër (7)
6.	Séné FC (6)	0–3	Stade Plabennécois (6)
7.	Guipavas GdR (7)	1–2	GSI Pontivy (5)
8.	Saint-Colomban Sportive Locminé (4)	1–0	PD Ergué-Gabéric (5)
9.	Dernières Cartouches Carhaix (8)	3–1	Vie au Grand Air Bohars (8)
10.	EA Saint-Renan (6)	0–0 (9–8 p)	Plougastel FC (6)
11.	Stade Pontivyen (6)	0–1	Vannes OC (5)
12.	US Montagnarde (6)	0–0 (1–4 p)	US Concarneau (3)
13.	Stade Pleybennois (9)	0–4	Keriolets de Pluvigner (6)
14.	Hermine Concarnoise (8)	1–3	CEP Lorient (6)
15.	Baud FC (8)	0–3	Saint-Pierre de Milizac (5)
16.	RC Dinan (8)	0–6	Cercle Paul Bert Bréquigny (6)
17.	CS Plédran (8)	4–0	ES Frout Saint-Agathon (9)
18.	FC Guichen (7)	0–0 (3–4 p) (Note: Tie reversed from original draw.)	US Château-Malo (8)
19.	Plaintel SF (7)	0–0 (2–3 p)	Bleuets Le Pertre-Brielles-Gennes-Saint-Cyr (8)
20.	FC La Chapelle-Montgermont (9)	0–2	AS Vitré (5)
21.	Stade Pleudihennais (8)	2–2 (2–4 p)	Loudéac OSC (7)
22.	Ploërmel FC (6)	1–1 (4–5 p)	US Fougères (5)
23.	US Liffré (6)	2–1	Stade Castelbourgeois FC (6)
24.	Moutons Blanc de Noyal-Pontivy (8)	0–5	AS Vignoc-Hédé-Guipel (6)
25.	Muzillac OS (8)	1–3	US Saint-Malo (4)
26.	Enfants de Guer (8)	0–4	AS Ginglin Cesson (6)
27.	FC Aubinois (7)	0–4	Dinan Léhon FC (4)
28.	AS Saint-Jacques (6)	0–2	Stade Briochin (3)
29.	ES Saint-Cast-le-Guildo (9)	2–2 (5–4 p)	Cadets de Bains (6)
30.	FC Dinardais (7)	0–1	FC Breteil-Talensac (7)

=== Sixth round ===
These matches were played on 25 and 26 October 2025.

Sixth round results: Brittany
Tie no	Home team (tier)	Score	Away team (tier)
1.	AS Plouvien (7)	2–4	Stade Quimperlois (8)
2.	Vannes OC (5)	0–1	Dinan Léhon FC (4)
3.	Dernières Cartouches Carhaix (8)	2–2 (2–4 p)	AG Plouvorn (6)
4.	US Liffré (6)	1–3	Saint-Colomban Sportive Locminé (4)
5.	CEP Lorient (6)	0–1	Stade Plabennécois (6)
6.	Loudéac OSC (7)	1–3	EA Saint-Renan (6)
7.	Keriolets de Pluvigner (6)	0–3	Stade Briochin (3)
8.	FC Pen Hir Camaret (8)	2–2 (4–3 p)	Cercle Paul Bert Bréquigny (6)
9.	AS Ginglin Cesson (6)	2–2 (7–8 p)	US Concarneau (3)
10.	US Château-Malo (8)	1–0	FC Breteil-Talensac (7)
11.	AS Vignoc-Hédé-Guipel (6)	0–3	US Saint-Malo (4)
12.	US Fougères (5)	1–3	AS Vitré (5)
13.	CS Plédran (8)	3–2	ES Saint-Cast-le-Guildo (9)
14.	Saint-Pierre de Milizac (5)	2–2 (4–5 p)	GSI Pontivy (5)
15.	Bleuets Le Pertre-Brielles-Gennes-Saint-Cyr (8)	3–0	US Cléder (9)
