= Junior Noubi Fotso =

Gabonese footballer (born 1999)

Personal information
- Date of birth: 20 June 1999 (age 27)
- Place of birth: Libreville, Gabon
- Height: 1.89 m (6 ft 2 in)
- Position: Goalkeeper

Team information
- Current team: Pontivy

Senior career*
Years	Team	Apps	(Gls)
2018	CF Mounana		
2018–2019	Saint-Nazaire	3	(0)
2019–2021	Cholet	0	(0)
2021–2023	Vannes	8	(0)
2023–2025	Fougères	26	(0)
2026–	Pontivy	0	(0)

International career^{‡}
2022–	Gabon	5	(0)
- * Club domestic league appearances and goals as of 16:12, 22 September 2026 (UTC) ‡ National team caps and goals as of 16:12, 22 September 2026 (UTC)

Junior Noubi Fotso (born 20 June 1999) is a Gabonese professional footballer who plays as a goalkeeper for Championnat National 1 club Pontivy and the Gabon national team.

== International career ==
Noubi Fotso made his international debut for the Gabon national team in a 3–0 friendly loss to Burkina Faso on 2 January 2022. He was selected for the 2021 Africa Cup of Nations held in Cameroon in January and February 2022.
