= Tréglonou =

Tréglonou Treglonoù
- Commune
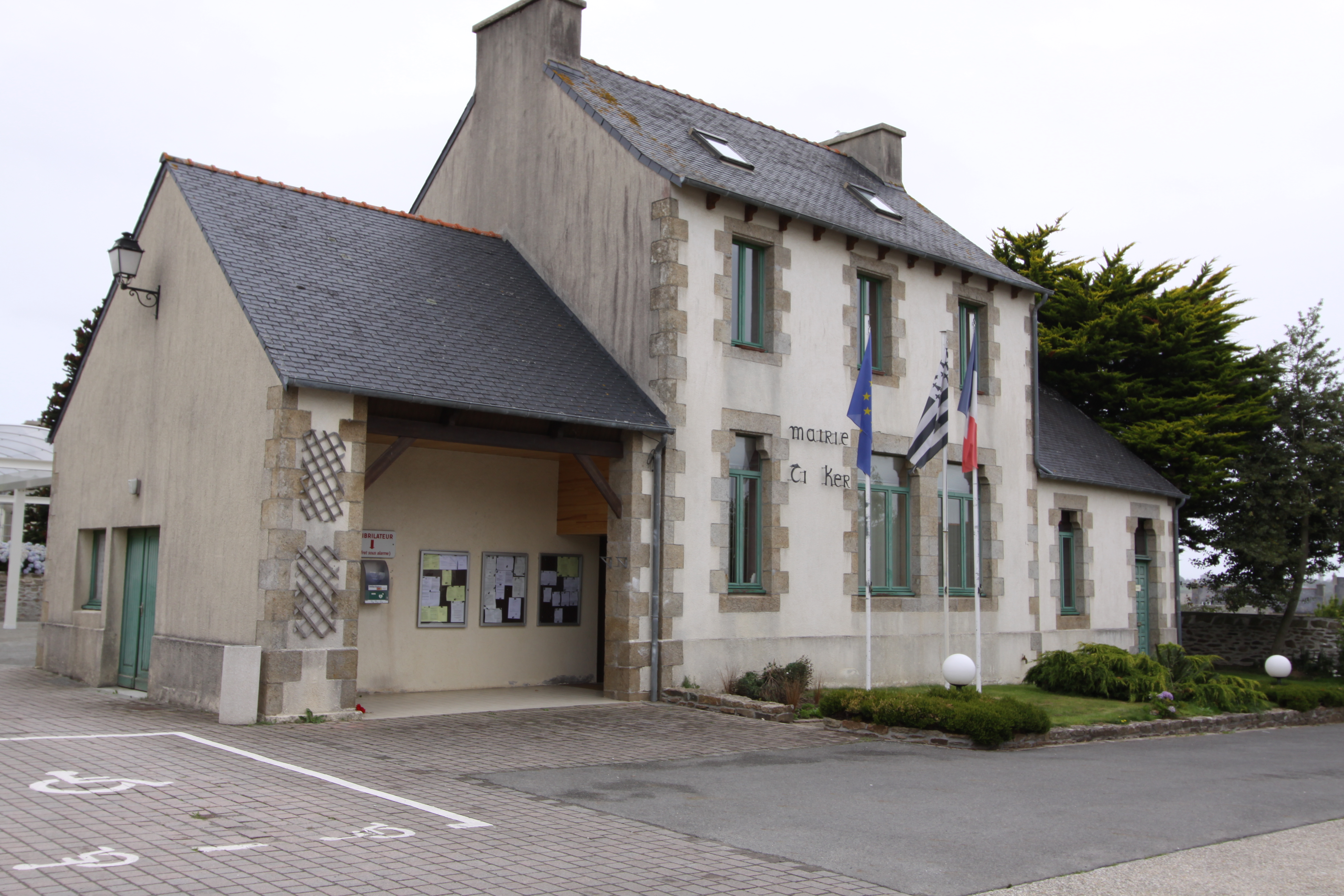
- The town hall in Tréglonou

- Coat of arms
- Location of Tréglonou
- Location within France Location within Brittany
- Coordinates: 48°33′05″N 4°32′20″W
- Country: France
- Region: Brittany
- Department: Finistère
- Arrondissement: Brest
- Canton: Plabennec

Government
  - Mayor (2020–2026): Guy Taloc
- Area^{1}: 5.85 km^{2} (2.26 sq mi)
- Highest elevation: 67 m (220 ft)
- Lowest elevation: 0 m (0 ft)
- Population (2023): 689
  - Density: 118/km^{2} (305/sq mi)
- Time zone: UTC+01:00 (CET)
  - Summer (DST): UTC+02:00 (CEST)
- INSEE/Postal code: 29290 /29870
- ^{1} French Land Register data, which excludes lakes, ponds, glaciers > 1 km^{2} (0.386 sq mi or 247 acres) and river estuaries.

Tréglonou (French pronunciation: [tʁeɡlɔnu]; Breton: Treglonoù) is a commune in the Finistère department of Brittany in north-western France.

== Population ==
Inhabitants of Tréglonou are called in French Tréglonousiens.

== See also ==
- Communes of the Finistère department
