= Plabennec =

Plabennec Plabenneg
- Commune
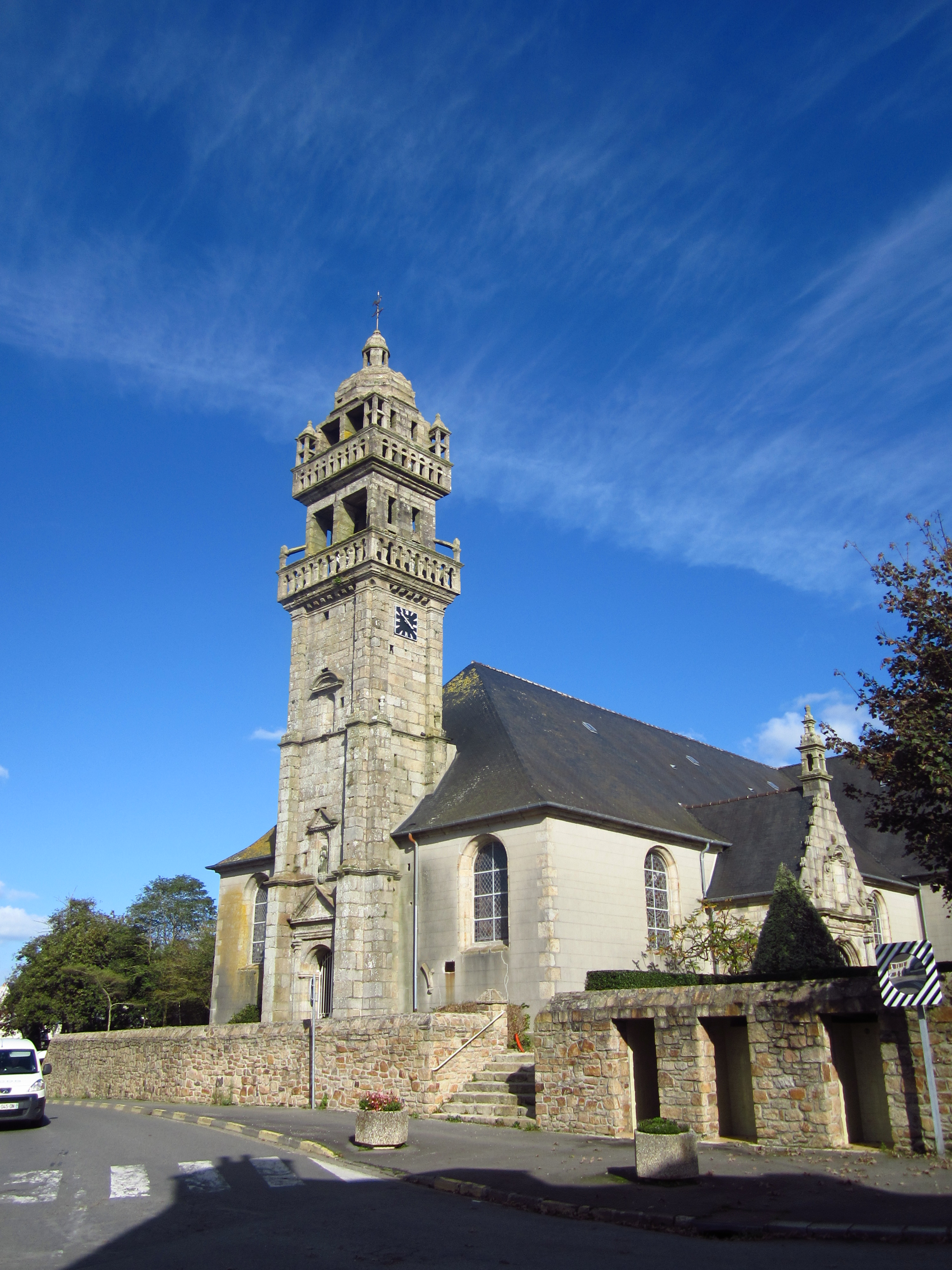
- The church of Saint-Ténénan, in Plabennec

- Coat of arms
- Location of Plabennec
- Location within France Location within Brittany
- Coordinates: 48°30′10″N 4°25′29″W
- Country: France
- Region: Brittany
- Department: Finistère
- Arrondissement: Brest
- Canton: Plabennec

Government
  - Mayor (2020–2026): Marie-Annick Créac'h-Cadec
- Area^{1}: 50.43 km^{2} (19.47 sq mi)
- Highest elevation: 102 m (335 ft)
- Lowest elevation: 28 m (92 ft)
- Population (2023): 8,686
  - Density: 172.2/km^{2} (446.1/sq mi)
- Time zone: UTC+01:00 (CET)
  - Summer (DST): UTC+02:00 (CEST)
- INSEE/Postal code: 29160 /29860
- ^{1} French Land Register data, which excludes lakes, ponds, glaciers > 1 km^{2} (0.386 sq mi or 247 acres) and river estuaries.

Plabennec (French pronunciation: [plabɛnɛk]; Breton: Plabenneg) is a commune in the Finistère department of Brittany in north-western France.

== History ==
The area around Plabennec has been occupied since Neolithic times and into the Bronze Age. The commune of Plabennec was formed around the 6th century by a Breton, Saint Abennec. Its name comes from a portmanteau of two Breton language words, Plou and Abennec, which translates as "Parish of Saint Abennec".

The land in the area is especially good for growing crops. Since the 19th century, things such as linen, hemp and wheat have been grown locally. In more recent times, with the advancement of agriculture, the land has started to be used for potato growing.

== Population ==
Inhabitants of Plabennec are called in French Plabennecois.

Historical population

Year	Pop.	±% p.a.
1793	3,080	—
1800	3,086	+0.03%
1806	3,779	+3.43%
1821	3,000	−1.53%
1831	3,831	+2.48%
1836	3,540	−1.57%
1841	3,555	+0.08%
1846	3,624	+0.39%
1851	3,752	+0.70%
1856	3,663	−0.48%
1861	3,557	−0.59%
1866	3,571	+0.08%
1872	3,556	−0.07%
1876	3,556	+0.00%
1881	3,658	+0.57%
1886	3,577	−0.45%
1891	3,658	+0.45%
1896	3,606	−0.29%
1901	3,628	+0.12%

Year	Pop.	±% p.a.
1906	3,836	+1.12%
1911	3,887	+0.26%
1921	3,823	−0.17%
1926	3,758	−0.34%
1931	3,713	−0.24%
1936	3,768	+0.29%
1946	4,098	+0.84%
1954	4,036	−0.19%
1962	4,389	+1.05%
1968	4,484	+0.36%
1975	5,168	+2.05%
1982	6,435	+3.18%
1990	6,600	+0.32%
1999	6,997	+0.65%
2007	7,679	+1.17%
2012	8,277	+1.51%
2017	8,436	+0.38%
2023	8,686	+0.49%

Source: EHESS and INSEE (1968-2023)

== Breton language ==
In 2008, 13.88% of primary-school children in Plabennec attended bilingual schools, where Breton language is taught alongside French.

== Economy ==
Since the 1960s a lot has changed in the economy of the area. The popularity of new vehicles and mechanicalisation of farming has led to certain professions, such as blacksmiths and saddlers, disappearing. However, many people are now moving to the area to live in the revamped barns and lodges.

Most money in the area comes from tourism (due to the fact it is only 10 km from Brest Bretagne Airport), industry, hand-crafted goods and agriculture.

== Sport ==
Plabennec is home to the Championnat National team Stade Plabennécois, who play at the Stade de Kervéguen in the commune. The club also deals with other sports such as basketball, handball and volleyball.

== International relations ==
Plabennec has been twinned with Waltenhofen in Germany since 1976.

== See also ==
- Communes of the Finistère department
