= Canton of Plabennec =

Coordinates: 48.50°N 4.43°W

The canton of Plabennec is an administrative division of the Finistère department, northwestern France. Its borders were modified at the French canton reorganisation which came into effect in March 2015. Its seat is in Plabennec.

It consists of the following communes:

1. Bourg-Blanc
2. Coat-Méal
3. Kersaint-Plabennec
4. Lampaul-Ploudalmézeau
5. Landéda
6. Landunvez
7. Lannilis
8. Plabennec
9. Ploudalmézeau
10. Plouguin
11. Plouvien
12. Saint-Pabu
13. Tréglonou
