= Lampaul-Ploudalmézeau =

Lampaul-Ploudalmézeau Lambaol-Gwitalmeze
- Commune
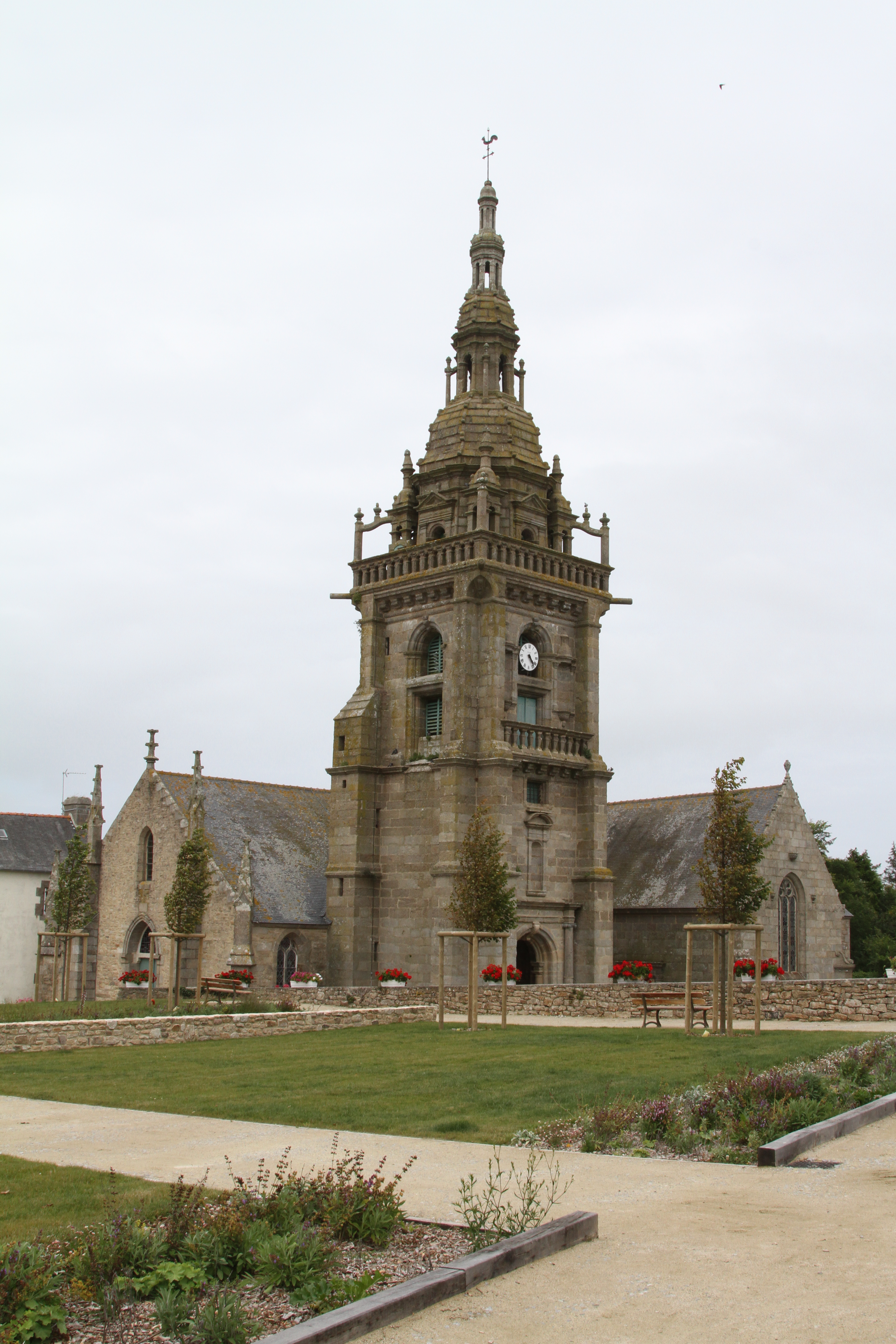
- The parish church of Saint-Pol-Aurélien

- Coat of arms
- Location of Lampaul-Ploudalmézeau
- Location within France Location within Brittany
- Coordinates: 48°33′40″N 4°39′14″W
- Country: France
- Region: Brittany
- Department: Finistère
- Arrondissement: Brest
- Canton: Plabennec
- Intercommunality: Pays d'Iroise

Government
  - Mayor (2020–2026): Anne Apprioual
- Area^{1}: 6.35 km^{2} (2.45 sq mi)
- Highest elevation: 63 m (207 ft)
- Lowest elevation: 0 m (0 ft)
- Population (2023): 816
  - Density: 129/km^{2} (333/sq mi)
- Time zone: UTC+01:00 (CET)
  - Summer (DST): UTC+02:00 (CEST)
- INSEE/Postal code: 29099 /29830
- Website: https://lampaul-ploudalmezeau.bzh/
- ^{1} French Land Register data, which excludes lakes, ponds, glaciers > 1 km^{2} (0.386 sq mi or 247 acres) and river estuaries.

Lampaul-Ploudalmézeau (French pronunciation: [lɑ̃pɔl pludalmezo]; Breton: Lambaol-Gwitalmeze) is a commune in the Finistère department of Brittany in north-western France.

== Population ==
Historical population
Year	Pop.	±% p.a.
1968	516	—
1975	538	+0.60%
1982	548	+0.26%
1990	595	+1.03%
1999	606	+0.20%
2007	700	+1.82%
2012	794	+2.55%
2017	838	+1.08%
2023	816	−0.44%
Source: INSEE

Inhabitants of Lampaul-Ploudalmézeau are called in French Lampaulais.

== See also ==
- Communes of the Finistère department
