= Stade Plabennécois =

French football club, based in Plabennec

Stade Plabennec
- Full name: Stade Plabennécois Football
- Founded: 1934; 92 years ago
- Ground: Stade de Kervéguen, Plabennec
- Capacity: 5,000
- Chairman: Jean-Luc L'Hostis
- Manager: Gwenn Servais and Bernard Maligorne
- League: Régional 1
- 2024–25: National 3 Group C, 13th of 14 (Relegated)
- Website: http://www.plab29.com/
Home colours	Away colours

Stade Plabennécois Football (Breton: Plabenneg; commonly referred to as simply Plabennec) is a French association football club based in the commune of Plabennec. The club was founded in 1934 and achieved promotion to the Championnat National after winning its group in the 2008–09 edition of the Championnat de France amateur. The team was relegated to the CFA after they finished 19th in the 2010–11 Championnat National season. Since then they have been promoted and relegated between the fourth and fifth tier division on a number of occasions, and as of the 2025–26 season play in Régional 1.

Plabennec plays its home matches at the Stade de Kervéguen located within the city.

== Players ==
=== Notable former players ===
For a list of former Plabennec players, see Category:Stade Plabennécois players.

== Honours ==
- Division d'Honneur (Brittany): 1993
- Coupe de Bretagne runners-up: 1993
