= GSI Pontivy =

Association football club in France

- Full name: Garde Saint-Ivy Pontivy
- Founded: 1909 (Gymnastics section); 1935 (football section)
- Ground: Stade Municipal du Faubourg de Verdun; Pontivy, France
- Capacity: 3,140
- Chairman: Philippe Le Mestre
- Manager: Stéphane Le Garrec
- League: National 3 Group C
- 2025-26: National 3 Group C, 1st
- Website: https://www.gsi-pontivy.com
Home colours	Away colours

GSI Pontivy (French: Garde Saint-Ivy Pontivy) is a French football club based in Pontivy, Morbihan. It was founded in 1935. They play at the Stade Municipal du Faubourg de Verdun, which has a capacity of 3,200. The colours of the club are green and white.

The club will play in the Championnat National 1 for the 2026-27 season, following promotion from the Championnat National 2.

== Honours ==
- Brittany DH championship : 1994

== Current squad ==
As of 16 January 2011

Note: Flags indicate national team as defined under FIFA eligibility rules; some limited exceptions apply. Players may hold more than one non-FIFA nationality.

No.	Pos.	Nation	Player
—	GK	FRA	Rumwald Le Guevel
—	GK	FRA	Boris Mahe
—	GK	FRA	Julien Le Metayer
—	DF	FRA	Romain Alazet
—	DF	FRA	Eric Blocus
—	DF	FRA	Rudy Christophe
—	DF	FRA	Clotaire Duclovel
—	DF	FRA	Gaël Le Guerroué
—	DF	FRA	Mickaël Le Guével
—	MF	TUR	Kerim Bas
—	MF	POR	Tony Da Costa
—	MF	FRA	Benoît Debato

No.	Pos.	Nation	Player
—	MF	NCL	Jean-Luc Edern Guyader
—	MF	FRA	Romain Houdeline
—	MF	POR	Maxime Le Cocq
—	MF	FRA	Romain Houdeline
—	MF	FRA	Yann Poulichet
—	MF	FRA	Maxime Rault
—	MF	FRA	Mickaël Tison
—	FW	FRA	Romain Alazet
—	FW	MTQ	Gilles Bray
—	FW	FRA	Jean-Marie Eveno
—	FW	FRA	Guénaël Havart
—	FW	FRA	Steve Le Lay
