= 2020–21 Coupe de France preliminary rounds, Brittany =

(2020–21) Coupe de France Brittany preliminaries

The 2020–21 Coupe de France preliminary rounds, Brittany was the qualifying competition to decide which teams from the leagues of the Brittany region of France took part in the main competition from the seventh round.

A total of twelve teams qualified from the Brittany Preliminary rounds. In 2019–20, FC Guichen and Stade Briochin progressed the furthest in the main competition, reaching the ninth round before losing to Caen (1–2) and ESM Gonfreville (on penalties) respectively.

== Schedule ==
A total of 687 teams entered from the region. 666 teams entered at the first round stage, which took place on 30 August 2020, with one team given a bye to the second round. The first round draw was published on 30 July 2020. The second round draw was published on 1 September 2020.

The third round draw, which featured the teams from Championnat National 3, was made on 10 September 2020. The fourth round draw, which featured the teams from Championnat National 2, was made on 23 September 2020. The fifth round draw, which saw the two Championnat National teams from the region enter the competition, was made on 7 October 2020. The sixth round draw was made on 21 October 2020.

=== First round ===
These matches were played on 29 and 30 August 2020.

First round results: Brittany
Tie no	Home team (tier)	Score	Away team (tier)
1.	ACS Bieuzy-les-Eaux (11)	0–5	FC Klegereg (8)
2.	Stade Guémenois (9)	1–0	FC Meslan (10)
3.	ES Ségliennaise (11)	0–4	Ajoncs d'Or Saint-Malguénac (9)
4.	ES Le Crosty-Saint Caradec (11)	1–5	FC Plouay (7)
5.	FL Inguiniel (10)	4–0	AS Priziac (10)
6.	AS Bubry (11)	2–4	SC Sournais (9)
7.	Avenir du Pays Pourleth (9)	7–1	US Berné (10)
8.	Melrand Sports (9)	2–3	US Langoëlan-Ploërdut (10)
9.	Caudan SF (9)	0–1	Stiren Cléguer FC (9)
10.	FC Kerchopine (10)	3–2	AS Guermeur (11)
11.	US Goëlands de Larmor-Plage (8)	2–0	La Guideloise (9)
12.	FOLC Lorient Ouest (9)	0–3 (Note: Tie won by means of forfeit.)	AS Lanester (8)
13.	CS Quéven (8)	0–5	CEP Lorient (6)
14.	US Groix (10)	2–3	FC Kerzec (11)
15.	Lanester FC (9)	0–0 (2–3 p)	AS Gestel (8)
16.	JA Arzano (9)	1–6	FC Ploemeur (7)
17.	Fleur d'Ajonc Inzinzac (10)	2–6	Entente Saint-Gilloise (10)
18.	AL Camors (9)	0–2	CS Pluméliau (8)
19.	Guénin Sport (8)	1–1 (3–1 p)	Stade Hennebontais (9)
20.	Paotred du Tarun (10)	4–3	Languidic FC (7)
21.	La Locminoise (10)	0–1	AS Saint-Barthélemy (10)
22.	AS Calanaise (9)	0–4	Baud FC (8)
23.	Plumelin Sports (11)	2–2 (4–2 p)	FC Quistinic (10)
24.	US Bieuzy-Lanvaux (11)	2–1	AS Kergonan (9)
25.	ES Remungol (10)	0–5	US Montagnarde (6)
26.	AS Pluvignoise (10)	1–3	Stade Gavrais (10)
27.	Landaul Sports (8)	3–0	Stade Landévantais (9)
28.	ES Merlevenez (9)	1–4	Keriolets de Pluvigner (6)
29.	US Brech (8)	4–3	Lorient Sports (7)
30.	VFL Keryado (10)	1–13	Saint-Efflam Kervignac (8)
31.	ES Sud Outre Rade (8)	0–1	AS Bélugas Belz (8)
32.	Hermine Locoal-Mendon (10)	0–8	Plouhinec FC (8)
33.	Riantec OC (8)	4–1	Avenir Sainte-Hélène (9)
34.	FC Locmariaquer-Saint-Philibert (9)	0–5	Auray FC (6)
35.	CS Pluneret (9)	2–2 (4–3 p)	AS Belle-Île-en-Mer (10)
36.	ASC Baden (10)	4–3	AS Turcs de l'Ouest (10)
37.	US Arradon (8)	5–0	ES Mériadec (9)
38.	ES Crac'h (9)	1–0	ASC Sainte Anne-d'Auray (9)
39.	US Ploeren (9)	4–0	Prat Poulfanc Sport (10)
40.	Carnac FC (9)	2–1	AS Plouharnel (10)
41.	ES Ploemel (8)	0–1	FC Quiberon Saint-Pierre (8)
42.	AS Plougoumelen-Bono (9)	1–3	AS Ménimur (7)
43.	Avenir Buléon-Lantillac (10)	3–1	CS Josselin (8)
44.	Saint-Hubert Sport Lanouée (9)	3–1	Bleuets de Crédin (10)
45.	Saint-Clair Réguiny (10)	0–0 (2–4 p)	Enfants de Saint-Gildas (8)
46.	FC Naizin (8)	4–2	Garde Saint-Cyr Moréac (8)
47.	US Rohannaise (10)	0–0 (4–5 p)	Garde Saint-Eloi Kerfourn (9)
48.	Entente Mohon-Saint-Malo-des-Trois-Fontaines (12)	0–10	Espérance Bréhan (7)
49.	AS Kergrist (10)	1–7	Moutons Blanc de Noyal-Pontivy (7)
50.	Vigilante Radenac (11)	0–5	Saint-Pierre Pleugriffet (10)
51.	Garde Saint-Arnould Saint-Allouestre (11)	0–0 (5–6 p)	Garde du Gohazé Saint Thuriau (10)
52.	ES Saint-Avé (8)	1–0	CS Bignan (7)
53.	EFC Saint-Jean Brévelay (8)	2–0	Garde du Loch (9)
54.	La Sérentaise (9)	1–3	AS Moustoir-Ac (9)
55.	Rah-Koëd Plaudren FC (9)	7–1	AS Meucon (9)
56.	AS Monterblanc (9)	1–0	La Mélécienne de Plumelec (9)
57.	Semeurs de Grand-Champ (9)	4–2	AS Brévelaise (10)
58.	Cadets de Guéhenno (10)	0–16	ES Plescop (7)
59.	Ajoncs d'Or Saint-Nolff (10)	4–1	Chevaliers Saint-Maurice Saint-Guyomard (10)
60.	ES Colpo (10)	1–4	AS Cruguel (8)
61.	US Saint-Melaine Rieux (8)	6–1	AG Arzal (9)
62.	Muzillac OS (8)	9–1	Armoricaine Péaule (9)
63.	AS Arzon (10)	0–8	FC Basse Vilaine (8)
64.	Garde du Pont Marzan (8)	1–2	Montagnards Sulniac (9)
65.	ES Trinitaine (11)	0–13	Avenir Theix (7)
66.	Damgan-Ambon Sport (9)	0–2	Séné FC (6)
67.	ES Surzur (10)	2–5	Bogue D'Or Questembert (8)
68.	Saint-Sébastien Caden (9)	2–0	Sarzeau FC (8)
69.	JF Noyal-Muzillac (9)	5–3	AS Berric-Lauzach (9)
70.	Caro/Missiriac AS (9)	1–3	Ploërmel FC (6)
71.	AS La Claie (10)	0–4	Enfants de Guer (7)
72.	Garde de Mi-Voie Guillac (10)	0–2	Ecureils Roc-Saint-André (9)
73.	Indépendante Mauronnaise (9)	7–2	Elan Montertelotais (10)
74.	OC Beignon (10)	1–1 (0–2 p)	US Saint-Abraham Chapelle-Caro (9)
75.	Avenir Campénéac Augan (10)	4–1	Aurore de Taupont (9)
76.	AS Croix-Helléan (10)	2–1	Avenir de Guilliers (10)
77.	Garde de l'Yvel Loyat (10)	2–5	Saint-Jean de Villenard Sports (10)
78.	Bleuets Néant-sur-Yvel (10)	0–0 (4–3 p)	Avenir Saint-Servant-sur-Oust (9)
79.	JA Peillac (10)	0–4	Ruffiac-Malestroit (8)
80.	AS Saint-Eloi La Vraie-Croix (9)	0–2	Elvinoise Foot (7)
81.	Avenir Saint-Vincent-sur-Oust (10)	1–13	ES Larré-Molac (10)
82.	JA Pleucadeuc (10)	2–2 (4–5 p)	La Patriote Malansac (8)
83.	Saint-Léon de Glénac (10)	0–2	ES Quelneuc (10)
84.	Les Fougerêts-Saint-Martin-sur-Oust (9)	3–3 (4–1 p)	FC Cournon 56 (10)
85.	Espoir Saint-Jacut-les-Pins (8)	1–2	US La Gacilly (7)
86.	CS Saint-Gaudence Allaire (9)	1–3	FC Saint-Perreux (9)
87.	US Le Cours (10)	0–4	Fondelienne Carentoir (9)
88.	JA Penvénan (10)	0–5	US Perros-Louannec (7)
89.	FC Lizildry (10)	0–6	US Ploubezre (9)
90.	SC Trédarzec (12)	2–3	CS Rospez (10)
91.	CS Trégastel (11)	1–4	Entente du Trieux FC (9)
92.	UO Trégor (9)	1–2	FC Trébeurden-Pleumeur-Bodou (8)
93.	Stade Kénanais (10)	0–3	AS Pleubian-Pleumeur (9)
94.	Goëlands de Plouézec FC (12)	0–3	Union Squiffiec-Trégonneau (9)
95.	FC Trélévern-Trévou (9)	2–3	Avenir du Goëlo (8)
96.	US Kérity (9)	0–8	CS Bégard (6)
97.	AS Plestinaise (9)	1–6	Trégor FC (8)
98.	Méné Bré Sports Pédernec (9)	0–1	AS Trédrez-Locquémeau (8)
99.	ES Plougrasienne (11)	0–5	AS Ploumilliau (9)
100.	Plouha FC (11)	0–4	US Trieux-Lézardrieux-Pleudaniel (9)
101.	ES Rudonou (10)	1–7	US Plouisy (8)
102.	AS Servel-Lannion (9)	2–1	US Méné Bré Louargat (10)
103.	AS Saint-Émilion (11)	2–5	Breizh Olympique Caouënnec-Lanvézéac (10)
104.	FC Plouagat-Châtelaudren-Lanrodec (9)	5–3	US Pays Rochois et Langoatais (8)
105.	FC La Chapelle-Neuve (11)	3–1	US Prat (10)
106.	US Goudelin (7)	2–1 (Note: Tie reversed from original draw.)	ES Le Fœil (9)
107.	Plounévez-Lanrivain-Trémargat US (9)	0–1	RC Ploumagoar (7)
108.	US Briacine (10)	1–2	JS Cavan (8)
109.	US Pluzunet-Tonquédec (10)	1–3	AS Grâces (8)
110.	US Callac (10)	0–3	Association Mahoraise Guingamp (9)
111.	ES Guer (10)	0–4	JS Lanvollon (8)
112.	ES Trébrivan (11)	2–8	AS Kérien-Magoar (10)
113.	US Maël-Carhaix (10)	1–2	FC La Croix-Corlay (8)
114.	Stade Charles de Blois Guingamp (9)	0–2	Goëlo FC (8)
115.	US Tréglamus (10)	2–0	AS Plélo (9)
116.	FC Kreiz Breizh (9)	0–1	AS Uzel-Merléac (7)
117.	Rostrenen FC (8)	1–0	US Saint-Caradec (9)
118.	FC Le Vieux Bourg (11)	4–1	Trieux FC (10)
119.	US Argoat-Pélem (10)	2–2 (2–0 p)	FC Saint-Bugan (8)
120.	AS Tagarine (12)	5–1	ES Frout Saint-Agathon (10)
121.	La Plœucoise Foot (9)	1–11	Loudéac OSC (6)
122.	FC Poulancre-Múr-Saint-Gilles (9)	0–5	Plaintel SF (7)
123.	Étoile du Leff Boqueho (9)	1–3	AS Ginglin Cesson (6)
124.	AS Motterieux (9)	0–2	US Quessoy (6)
125.	AS Pyramide Lanfains (10)	1–10	FC Lié (8)
126.	FC Centre Bretagne (8)	0–3	Saint-Brandan-Quintin FC (7)
127.	AS Trévé Sports (10)	0–6	US Saint-Carreuc-Hénon (8)
128.	JS Allineuc (10)	0–8	CS Merdrignac (8)
129.	FC L'Hermitage Lorge (10)	0–5	Évron FC (8)
130.	FC Moncontour-Trédaniel (9)	1–1 (6–7 p)	AS Saint-Barnabé (10)
131.	Pordic-Binic FC (8)	1–1 (4–5 p)	CO Briochin Sportif Ploufraganais (7)
132.	US Saint-Donan (10)	2–2 (4–2 p)	Gouessant Foot Coëtmieux-Andel-Morieux-Pommeret (9)
133.	AS Trémuson (9)	0–8	Lamballe FC (6)
134.	Étoile Sud Armor Porhoët (9)	4–1	US Trémorel (10)
135.	CS Illifaut (10)	1–7	ES Penguily (8)
136.	ES Trégomeuroise (10)	0–5	US Langueux (6)
137.	AS Trébry (11)	1–6	ALSL Plémy (10)
138.	US Plouasne-Saint-Juvat (8)	4–4 (1–3 p)	CS Lanrelas (9)
139.	CS Plédran (8)	1–1 (5–4 p)	CS Croix Lambert (9)
140.	UF Yffiniac (9)	0–0 (4–5 p)	Ploufragan FC (7)
141.	AS Saint-Herve (9)	0–6	Plérin FC (7)
142.	ASL Saint-Julien (10)	2–2 (4–2 p)	AS Trégueux (8)
143.	ES Noyal (11)	0–3	FC Côte de Penthièvre (10)
144.	AS Hillion-Saint-René (8)	0–2	US Hunaudaye (9)
145.	AS Broons-Trémeur (9)	1–1 (5–4 p)	AS Trélivan (7)
146.	Saint-Brieuc Football Ouest (10)	1–4	US Frémur-Fresnaye (7)
147.	JS Landéhen (10)	0–5	Plancoët-Arguenon FC (7)
148.	RC Dinan (12)	1–0	Les Vallées FC (9)
149.	AL Trélat-Taden (11)	0–0 (5–4 p)	ES Saint-Cast-le-Guildo (9)
150.	US Plumaugat (10)	0–3	Stade Évrannais (8)
151.	FC Beaussais-Rance-Frémur (9)	0–0 (2–1 p)	Stade Pleudihennais (7)
152.	AS Saint-Pôtan (11)	0–2	US Erquy (9)
153.	ES Hénansal-Saint-Denoual-La Bouillie Emeraude (10)	0–4	Val d'Arguenon Créhen-Pluduno (8)
154.	Rance Coëtquen Football (10)	1–4	FC Plélan Vildé Corseul (9)
155.	ES Champs-Géraux (11)	0–3	AS Bobital-Brusvily (9)
156.	US Lanvallay (9)	2–1	FC Hinglé-Trévron (10)
157.	AS Saint-Pierraise Épiniac (9)	0–3	Jeunesse Combourgeoise (7)
158.	La Mélorienne (9)	0–4	FC Dinardais (7)
159.	US Château-Malo (8)	1–3	AS Vignoc-Hédé-Guipel (6)
160.	Cercle Jules Ferry Saint Malo (9)	1–5	AS Miniac-Morvan (7)
161.	FC Baie du Mont Saint-Michel (9)	2–2 (5–4 p)	La Cancalaise (8)
162.	AS Montreuil-le-Gast (10)	1–3	US Gévezé (8)
163.	US Saint-Guinoux (10)	0–2	JA Saint-Servan (8)
164.	AS La Gouesnière (8)	2–1	Entente Samsonnaise Doloise (6)
165.	FC Meillac-Lanhélin-Bonnemain (10)	1–6	FC Aubinois (8)
166.	US Sens-de-Bretagne (10)	1–2	US Saint-Jouan-des-Guérets (8)
167.	CS La Richardais (10)	0–2	AS Jacques Cartier (8)
168.	US Baguer-Morvan (10)	0–5	Pleurtuit Côte d'Emeraude (8)
169.	US Cuguen (11)	0–3	Entente Sens-Vieux-Vy Gahard (9)
170.	La Baussaine-Saint-Thual FC (12)	1–2	FC Bord de Rance (10)
171.	La Chapelle-Janson/Fleurigné/Laignelet-le-Louroux (8)	2–3	US Liffré (6)
172.	Fougères FC (9)	0–4	US Billé-Javené (7)
173.	Espérance de Rennes (9)	3–0	CS Betton (8)
174.	AS Tremblay-Chauvigné (10)	0–3	US Gosné (9)
175.	US Erbrée-Mondevert (10)	0–3	ASC Romagné (8)
176.	ES Thorigné-Fouillard (8)	1–3	Espérance Chartres-de-Bretagne (6)
177.	Avenir Marpiré Champeaux (10)	1–7	Châteaubourg-Saint-Melaine FA (9)
178.	Olympic Montreuil-Landavran (10)	4–1	
179.	FC Louvigné-La Bazouge (9)	0–3	Stade Saint-Aubinais (8)
180.	Haute Vilaine FC (10)	3–0	FC Sud Fougerais (9)
181.	ES Saint-Aubin-des-Landes/EF Cornillé (10)	0–3	Espérance La Bouëxière (9)
182.	US Illet Forêt (8)	2–5	La Vitréenne FC (7)
183.	Entente Parigné/Landéan (10)	0–2	ASE Lécousse (9)
184.	CS Servon (8)	1–4	OC Cesson (6)
185.	FC des Landes (10)	0–4	ES Saint-Germain/Montours (9)
186.	AS Ercé-près-Liffré (9)	0–11	US Grégorienne (7)
187.	Torcé-Vergéal FC (10)	1–1 (4–5 p)	Indépendante Saint-Georges-de-Chesné (9)
188.	US Saint-Marc/Saint-Ouen (10)	2–2 (4–3 p)	FC Stéphanais Briçois (9)
189.	Avenir Lieuron (8)	1–6	FC Breteil-Talensac (6)
190.	FC Plélan-Maxent (9)	0–6	FC Hermitage-Chapelle-Cintré (7)
191.	FC Pays d'Anast (9)	0–4	OC Montauban (7)
192.	AS Parthenay-de-Bretagne (11)	1–11	FC Tinténiac-Saint-Domineuc (9)
193.	FC Mosaique Rennes (9)	0–2	CO Pacéen (7)
194.	AS Saint-Pern/Landujan (10)	1–3	Cercle Paul Bert Cleunay (10)
195.	US Saint-Méen-Saint-Onen (9)	2–3	US Saint-Gilles (7)
196.	Entente Langan-La Chapelle-Chausée (11)	0–6	FC La Mézière-Melesse (9)
197.	US Gaël Muel (10)	2–1	US Bédée-Pleumeleuc (8)
198.	SC Goven (10)	1–1 (5–4 p)	Cercle Paul Bert Villejean-Beauregard (11)
199.	FC Baulon-Lassy (10)	0–1	JA Bréal (8)
200.	US Guignen (9)	1–3	Eskouadenn de Brocéliande (7)
201.	Montfort-Iffendic (10)	1–3	Avenir Irodouër (8)
202.	US Pont-Péan (10)	1–2	FC Mordelles (9)
203.	AC Rennes (8)	1–3	SC Le Rheu (6)
204.	US Le Crouais (10)	0–1	SEP Quédillac (8)
205.	USC Chavagne (9)	0–3	FC Beauregard Rennes (8)
206.	ES Grand-Fougeray (11)	0–3	US Bain (9)
207.	Hermine La Noë Blanche (9)	0–5	Cadets de Bains (7)
208.	US Les Brulais-Comblessac (11)	1–0	US Bel Air (9)
209.	US Vern-sur-Seiche (8)	0–1	FC Guichen (6)
210.	US Sainte-Marie (10)	2–0	Espérance Sixt-sur-Aff (9)
211.	US Tertre Gris (9)	2–3	US Laillé (7)
212.	FC Bruz (8)	4–1	FC La Chapelle-Montgermont (8)
213.	FC Canton du Sel (11)	1–1 (4–5 p)	La Seiche FC (10)
214.	AS Saint-Jacques (9)	0–10	Cercle Paul Bert Bréquigny (7)
215.	Groupe Saint-Yves Saint-Just (10)	0–3	JA Pipriac (9)
216.	US Corps-Nuds (10)	0–3	AS Chantepie (8)
217.	Réveil de Lohéac (10)	2–1	Cercle Paul Bert Nord Ouest (11)
218.	Bleuets Le Pertre-Brielles-Gennes-Saint-Cyr (8)	0–3	FC Atlantique Vilaine (6)
219.	Cadets Chelun Martigné-Ferchaud (9)	1–0	ASC Saint-Erblon (10)
220.	Breizh Fobal Klub (9)	1–4	US Châteaugiron (7)
221.	US Noyal-Chatillon (9)	1–1 (5–6 p)	US Acigné (8)
222.	US Bourgbarré (9)	1–3	RC Rannée-La Guerche-Drouges (7)
223.	US Chapelloise (11)	1–2	JS Nouvoitou (10)
224.	Châteaubourg FC (9)	1–1 (8–9 p)	Jeunes d'Argentré (7)
225.	US Val d'Izé (9)	1–4	JA Balazé (8)
226.	US Orgères (10)	0–2	Cercle Paul Bert Gayeulles (9)
227.	OC Brétillien (10)	0–2	Domloup Sport (8)
228.	AS Étrelles (10)	2–1	US Janzé (8)
229.	ES Brie (10)	1–3	Stade Louvignéen (8)
230.	AS Livré/Mecé (10)	3–0	US Domagné-Saint-Didier (9)
231.	Espérance Bréal-sous-Vitré (10)	0–7	Noyal-Brécé FC (8)
232.	US Saint-Armel (10)	0–1	AS Retiers-Coësmes (8)
233.	ASC Mahoraise Brest (9)	0–1	EA Saint-Renan (6)
234.	Gars Saint-Majan (10)	0–3	ASPTT Brest (7)
235.	Légion Saint-Pierre (9)	0–2	Vie au Grand Air Bohars (7)
236.	Association Cavale Blanche Brest (11)	0–3	US Plougonvelin (8)
237.	AS Ploumoguer (10)	1–4	FC Lampaulais (9)
238.	Arzelliz Ploudalmézeau (9)	5–3	AS Guilers (8)
239.	PL Bergot (10)	3–5	PL Pilier Rouge (10)
240.	AS Brest (8)	7–0	PL Lambézellec (10)
241.	AJA Brélès Lanildut (11)	1–3	SC Lanrivoaré (9)
242.	Étoile Saint-Arzel (10)	1–3	ES Locmaria-Plouzané (9)
243.	Saint-Divy Sports (9)	1–2	Guipavas GdR (6)
244.	JS Saint-Thonanaise (9)	1–3	Espérance Plouguerneau (7)
245.	SC Lannilis (9)	2–2 (3–2 p)	ES Portsall Kersaint (7)
246.	AS Kersaint (9)	3–3 (2–4 p)	Gars de Saint-Yves (7)
247.	ES Guissény (11)	2–2 (5–4 p)	US Aber-Benoît Tréglonou (10)
248.	CND Le Folgoët (8)	2–5	AL Coataudon (8)
249.	AS Queliverzan (11)	0–3	FC Le Drennec (10)
250.	AS Landeda (9)	7–1	FC Côte des Légendes (9)
251.	JG Forestoise (10)	1–1 (1–3 p)	Hermine Kernilis (10)
252.	Avel Vor Saint-Pabu (11)	0–1	US Rochoise (10)
253.	FC Lanhouarneau-Plounévez-Lochrist (9)	0–2	Landerneau FC (6)
254.	ES Tréflez (10)	0–9	FC Gouesnou (7)
255.	Saint-Pierre Plouescat (9)	1–2	RC Lesnevien (7)
256.	US Saint-Servais-Saint-Derrien (11)	1–3	Cadets de Plougoulm (10)
257.	FC Gars du Roc'h (12)	1–3	US Pencran (10)
258.	FC Sainte-Sève (10)	2–6	Stade Landernéen Kergrèis (9)
259.	Bodilis-Plougar FC (8)	2–3	Étoile Saint-Yves Ploudaniel (8)
260.	ES Lampaulaise (10)	2–2 (3–5 p)	US Pont-Meur Guimiliau (9)
261.	Gâs de Plouider (10)	0–5	AS Plouvien (8)
262.	ES Plounéventer (9)	0–4	EF Plougourvest (9)
263.	Avenir Plourin (10)	0–3	Landi FC (7)
264.	ES Carantec-Henvic (8)	0–7	AG Plouvorn (7)
265.	US Lanmeur-Plouégat-Guérand (10)	1–3	FC Plouezoc'h (9)
266.	Paotred Rosko (10)	0–3	US Cléder (8)
267.	US Mespaul (11)	1–1 (4–3 p)	La Guerlesquinaise (10)
268.	ES Douron (10)	1–6	Stade Léonard Kreisker (9)
269.	Étoile Trégoroise Plougasnou (9)	4–0	US Plouigneau (9)
270.	US Taulé (9)	1–6	AS Berven-Plouzévédé (8)
271.	US Garlan (10)	3–3 (3–4 p)	Gars de Plouénan (9)
272.	Guiclan FC (8)	2–2 (3–4 p)	AS Santec (8)
273.	Gars de Plonévez-du-Faou (9)	1–3	Châteaulin FC (6)
274.	FC Le Relecq-Kerhuon (8)	2–2 (4–5 p)	Plougastel FC (7)
275.	AS Telgruc-sur-Mer (9)	0–5	Étoile Saint Laurent (7)
276.	US Quéménéven (10)	3–3 (2–4 p)	AS Pont-de-Buis (9)
277.	AS Camaretoise (11)	0–4	AS Dirinon (8)
278.	Racing Cast-Porzay (10)	0–3	FC Pen Hir Camaret (11)
279.	Saint-Nic Sports (10)	0–3	Stade Pleybennois (9)
280.	ES Cranou (9)	4–2	Lanvéoc Sports (9)
281.	FA de la Rade (10)	1–2	ES Mignonne (9)
282.	US Crozon-Morgat (10)	2–2 (4–5 p)	Gas du Menez-Hom (8)
283.	ES Pleyber-Christ (9)	0–3	ES Saint-Thégonnec (7)
284.	US Châteauneuf-du-Faou (9)	0–3	SC Morlaix (7)
285.	Avenir Guiscriff (9)	0–0 (3–2 p)	JU Plougonven (7)
286.	AS Sizun-Le Tréhou (9)	1–1 (4–5 p)	Dernières Cartouches Carhaix (8)
287.	US Poullaouen (10)	2–1	US Cléden-Poher (10)
288.	Plouyé Magic United (10)	0–4	AS Scrignac (8)
289.	AC Carhaix (9)	2–3	ES Berrien-Huelgoat (9)
290.	US Landeleau (9)	1–6	AS Saint-Martin-des-Champs (8)
291.	US Kergloff (11)	0–3	ES Gouézec (11)
292.	US Lennon (11)	3–1	Toros Plounévézel (10)
293.	US Saint Hernin (11)	2–3	AS Motreff (10)
294.	Goulien Sports (9)	0–3	AS Plobannalec-Lesconil (6)
295.	Cormorans Sportif de Penmarc'h (8)	2–2 (3–2 p)	FC Pont-l'Abbé (7)
296.	FC Penn-ar-Bed (9)	2–0	Combrit Sainte Marine FC (9)
297.	FC Goyen (11)	5–0	FC Treffiagat-Guilvinec (10)
298.	La Raquette Tréméoc (10)	3–1	Gars de Plomeur (9)
299.	ES Beuzec (9)	0–0 (5–6 p)	Gourlizon Sport (8)
300.	Marcassins Sportif Tréogat (10)	0–1	La Plozévetienne (8)
301.	Stade Pontécrucien (11)	0–4	FC Bigouden (10)
302.	ES Mahalon-Confort (10)	2–0	AS Plouhinécoise (10)
303.	US Pluguffan (9)	1–1 (1–3 p)	ES Plogonnec (8)
304.	Gas d'Ys Tréboul (9)	1–3	Stella Maris Douarnenez (6)
305.	Tricolores Landrévarzec (9)	2–3	Amicale Italia Bretagne (7)
306.	Plonéour FC (8)	0–4	Quimper Kerfeunteun FC (7)
307.	ES Langolen (9)	0–3	Paotred Briec (8)
308.	Pouldergat Sport (11)	1–4	FC Quimper Penhars (9)
309.	Lapins de Guengat (10)	1–1 (2–4 p)	AS Plomelin (8)
310.	US Île-Tudy (11)	0–3	AS Loctudy (10)
311.	US Saint-Évarzec (9)	3–1	Edern Sports (9)
312.	JS Plogastel (10)	0–2	AS Diables du Juch (10)
313.	ES Landudec-Guiler (10)	3–0	Zèbres de Trégourez (10)
314.	Amicale Ergué-Gabéric (8)	1–0	PD Ergué-Gabéric (6)
315.	Espoir Clohars Fouesnant (9)	0–3	US Quimperoise (7)
316.	AS Gâs de Leuhan (10)	1–5	EA Scaër (7)
317.	AS Laz (11)	0–13	AS Melgven (9)
318.	AS Kernével (10)	0–4	Glaziks de Coray (8)
319.	Mélénicks Elliant (8)	4–1	FC Pleuvennois (9)
320.	US Portugais Quimper (10)	1–6	PB Spézet (9)
321.	Saint-Thois Sports (11)	1–1 (6–5 p)	FC Odet (9)
322.	FC Rosporden (9)	1–1 (4–2 p)	Quimper Ergué-Armel FC (8)
323.	SS Saint-Goazec (11)	1–2	AS Saint-Yvi (10)
324.	US Fouesnant (8)	3–4	US Trégunc (6)
325.	Fleur de Genêt Bannalec (8)	1–3	US Moëlan (7)
326.	ES Rédené (9)	0–3	FC Quimperlois (7)
327.	AS Tréméven (10)	1–3	US Quimperloise (9)
328.	AS Baye (12)	3–3 (3–0 p)	CA Forestois (10)
329.	Stade Mellacois (9)	1–1 (5–4 p)	Gourin FC (8)
330.	US Saint-Thurien (11)	1–7	Locunolé Sports (9)
331.	Coquelicots du Trévoux (11)	0–4	US Clohars-Carnoët (9)
332.	FC Aven-Bélon (10)	3–1	US Querrien (10)
333.	ES Névez (9)	0–1	Hermine Concarnoise (8)

=== Second round ===
These matches were played on 5 and 6 September 2020.

Second round results: Brittany
Tie no	Home team (tier)	Score	Away team (tier)
1.	FC Quimper Penhars (9)	1–3	Stella Maris Douarnenez (6)
2.	ES Plogonnec (8)	0–3	Quimper Kerfeunteun FC (7)
3.	FC Penn-ar-Bed (9)	1–0	Amicale Italia Bretagne (7)
4.	ES Mahalon-Confort (10)	1–5	Paotred Briec (8)
5.	FC Bigouden (10)	2–3	AS Diables du Juch (10)
6.	ES Landudec-Guiler (10)	0–4	La Plozévetienne (8)
7.	FC Goyen (11)	0–3	Gourlizon Sport (8)
8.	Cormorans Sportif de Penmarc'h (8)	0–4	AS Plobannalec-Lesconil (6)
9.	FC Rosporden (9)	2–6	EA Scaër (7)
10.	AS Loctudy (10)	0–5	Amicale Ergué-Gabéric (8)
11.	La Raquette Tréméoc (10)	2–5	AS Plomelin (8)
12.	AS Motreff (10)	2–2 (3–4 p)	US Poullaouen (10)
13.	PB Spézet (9)	1–0	US Saint-Évarzec (9)
14.	ES Berrien-Huelgoat (9)	1–3	US Quimperoise (7)
15.	AS Melgven (9)	0–3	US Trégunc (6)
16.	US Moëlan (7)	8–0	Mélénicks Elliant (8)
17.	AS Saint-Yvi (10)	0–12	Glaziks de Coray (8)
18.	Locunolé Sports (9)	0–4	FC Quimperlois (7)
19.	Hermine Concarnoise (8)	7–1	US Clohars-Carnoët (9)
20.	US Quimperloise (9)	6–2	FC Aven-Bélon (10)
21.	AS Baye (12)	0–3	Stade Mellacois (9)
22.	ES Mignonne (9)	0–3	Châteaulin FC (6)
23.	ES Gouézec (11)	0–7	AS Scrignac (8)
24.	Stade Pleybennois (9)	2–4	Landi FC (7)
25.	AS Dirinon (8)	6–3	ES Cranou (9)
26.	US Lennon (11)	0–6	Plougastel FC (7)
27.	FC Pen Hir Camaret (11)	1–1 (4–5 p)	Saint-Thois Sports (11)
28.	AS Pont-de-Buis (9)	0–4	Étoile Saint Laurent (7)
29.	Dernières Cartouches Carhaix (8)	4–1	Gas du Menez-Hom (8)
30.	Cadets de Plougoulm (10)	1–8	Landerneau FC (6)
31.	AS Santec (8)	2–3	AS Saint-Martin-des-Champs (8)
32.	Gars de Plouénan (9)	2–2 (3–2 p)	Étoile Trégoroise Plougasnou (9)
33.	AG Plouvorn (7)	2–2 (4–2 p)	SC Morlaix (7)
34.	FC Plouezoc'h (9)	2–4	ES Saint-Thégonnec (7)
35.	US Mespaul (11)	3–2	US Pont-Meur Guimiliau (9)
36.	Stade Léonard Kreisker (9)	0–2	US Cléder (8)
37.	Étoile Saint-Yves Ploudaniel (8)	0–3	Guipavas GdR (6)
38.	EF Plougourvest (9)	1–0	FC Gouesnou (7)
39.	US Rochoise (10)	0–4	Espérance Plouguerneau (7)
40.	AL Coataudon (8)	4–1	SC Lannilis (9)
41.	US Pencran (10)	5–0	ES Guissény (11)
42.	Stade Landernéen Kergrèis (9)	1–2	AS Landeda (9)
43.	AS Berven-Plouzévédé (8)	0–3	RC Lesnevien (7)
44.	US Plougonvelin (8)	0–5	EA Saint-Renan (6)
45.	SC Lanrivoaré (9)	2–3	ASPTT Brest (7)
46.	PL Pilier Rouge (10)	1–5	Gars de Saint-Yves (7)
47.	Vie au Grand Air Bohars (7)	0–0 (3–4 p)	AS Plouvien (8)
48.	ES Locmaria-Plouzané (9)	3–0	AS Brest (8)
49.	FC Le Drennec (10)	0–1	FC Lampaulais (9)
50.	Hermine Kernilis (10)	0–6	Arzelliz Ploudalmézeau (9)
51.	JA Saint-Servan (8)	1–2	FC Dinardais (7)
52.	FC Aubinois (8)	1–0	AS Miniac-Morvan (7)
53.	Pleurtuit Côte d'Emeraude (8)	0–1	Jeunesse Combourgeoise (7)
54.	US Saint-Jouan-des-Guérets (8)	0–3	AS Vignoc-Hédé-Guipel (6)
55.	AS Jacques Cartier (8)	5–2	FC Baie du Mont Saint-Michel (9)
56.	FC Bord de Rance (10)	0–3	AS La Gouesnière (8)
57.	Entente Sens-Vieux-Vy Gahard (9)	0–3 (Note: Tie won by means of forfeit.)	ASC Romagné (8)
58.	US Acigné (8)	0–7	US Liffré (6)
59.	Châteaubourg-Saint-Melaine FA (9)	0–3	US Billé-Javené (7)
60.	Espérance La Bouëxière (9)	3–1	Olympic Montreuil-Landavran (10)
61.	ASE Lécousse (9)	3–5	Stade Saint-Aubinais (8)
62.	ES Saint-Germain/Montours (9)	1–1 (2–4 p)	US Saint-Marc/Saint-Ouen (10)
63.	AS Livré/Mecé (10)	0–2	AS Chantepie (8)
64.	Haute Vilaine FC (10)	2–2 (7–6 p)	JA Balazé (8)
65.	Indépendante Saint-Georges-de-Chesné (9)	3–0	AS Étrelles (10)
66.	Domloup Sport (8)	0–0 (7–8 p)	RC Rannée-La Guerche-Drouges (7)
67.	La Seiche FC (10)	0–0 (4–5 p)	AS Retiers-Coësmes (8)
68.	Espérance de Rennes (9)	0–2	US Grégorienne (7)
69.	US Gosné (9)	1–1 (4–2 p)	La Vitréenne FC (7)
70.	Stade Louvignéen (8)	1–6	OC Cesson (6)
71.	FC Mordelles (9)	1–1 (2–0 p)	Espérance Chartres-de-Bretagne (6)
72.	JA Bréal (8)	0–2	FC Breteil-Talensac (6)
73.	FC La Mézière-Melesse (9)	0–2	OC Montauban (7)
74.	FC Tinténiac-Saint-Domineuc (9)	3–0	Cercle Paul Bert Cleunay (10)
75.	US Gévezé (8)	0–4	FC Guichen (6)
76.	Avenir Irodouër (8)	0–5	CO Pacéen (7)
77.	Noyal-Brécé FC (8)	1–0	US Châteaugiron (7)
78.	US Les Brulais-Comblessac (11)	1–7	US Gaël Muel (10)
79.	SC Goven (10)	0–2	Eskouadenn de Brocéliande (7)
80.	Cadets Chelun Martigné-Ferchaud (9)	1–1 (4–3 p)	Jeunes d'Argentré (7)
81.	SEP Quédillac (8)	0–1	SC Le Rheu (6)
82.	FC Beauregard Rennes (8)	1–2	FC Hermitage-Chapelle-Cintré (7)
83.	US Bain (9)	1–3	Cadets de Bains (7)
84.	US Sainte-Marie (10)	1–5	US Laillé (7)
85.	Cercle Paul Bert Gayeulles (9)	0–2	Cercle Paul Bert Bréquigny (7)
86.	Réveil de Lohéac (10)	0–4	FC Bruz (8)
87.	JA Pipriac (9)	1–2	FC Atlantique Vilaine (6)
88.	JS Nouvoitou (10)	0–2	US Saint-Gilles (7)
89.	FC Kerchopine (10)	0–3	Saint-Efflam Kervignac (8)
90.	Entente Saint-Gilloise (10)	1–3	Stiren Cléguer FC (9)
91.	Avenir du Pays Pourleth (9)	3–0	FC Plouay (7)
92.	US Montagnarde (6)	2–0	CEP Lorient (6)
93.	US Langoëlan-Ploërdut (10)	1–1 (3–4 p)	Avenir Guiscriff (9)
94.	FL Inguiniel (10)	0–3	AS Lanester (8)
95.	FC Kerzec (11)	0–5	FC Ploemeur (7)
96.	AS Gestel (8)	0–4	Riantec OC (8)
97.	Stade Guémenois (9)	1–0	US Goëlands de Larmor-Plage (8)
98.	FC Klegereg (8)	0–3	FC Naizin (8)
99.	Ajoncs d'Or Saint-Malguénac (9)	2–1	Espérance Bréhan (7)
100.	AS Moustoir-Ac (9)	4–1	Saint-Hubert Sport Lanouée (9)
101.	Saint-Pierre Pleugriffet (10)	0–0 (1–4 p)	Paotred du Tarun (10)
102.	Garde du Gohazé Saint Thuriau (10)	0–2	Moutons Blanc de Noyal-Pontivy (7)
103.	CS Pluméliau (8)	2–1	Guénin Sport (8)
104.	Plumelin Sports (11)	1–6	Keriolets de Pluvigner (6)
105.	Garde Saint-Eloi Kerfourn (9)	2–1	Avenir Buléon-Lantillac (10)
106.	SC Sournais (9)	2–0	AS Saint-Barthélemy (10)
107.	AS Bélugas Belz (8)	1–0	Landaul Sports (8)
108.	Semeurs de Grand-Champ (9)	1–1 (6–5 p)	ES Plescop (7)
109.	ES Crac'h (9)	0–4	AS Ménimur (7)
110.	ASC Baden (10)	1–5	US Arradon (8)
111.	Stade Gavrais (10)	1–2	Baud FC (8)
112.	US Bieuzy-Lanvaux (11)	0–0 (3–4 p)	Carnac FC (9)
113.	US Brech (8)	4–1	US Ploeren (9)
114.	FC Quiberon Saint-Pierre (8)	2–0	CS Pluneret (9)
115.	Plouhinec FC (8)	1–1 (6–5 p)	Auray FC (6)
116.	Enfants de Saint-Gildas (8)	2–3	Ruffiac-Malestroit (8)
117.	Saint-Jean de Villenard Sports (10)	1–8	Enfants de Guer (7)
118.	Bleuets Néant-sur-Yvel (10)	0–4	US La Gacilly (7)
119.	AS Croix-Helléan (10)	1–3	Avenir Campénéac Augan (10)
120.	Ecureils Roc-Saint-André (9)	0–6	Ploërmel FC (6)
121.	ES Quelneuc (10)	0–10	AS Cruguel (8)
122.	Fondelienne Carentoir (9)	1–2	Indépendante Mauronnaise (9)
123.	US Saint-Abraham Chapelle-Caro (9)	10–0	Les Fougerêts-Saint-Martin-sur-Oust (9)
124.	FC Basse Vilaine (8)	1–0	ES Saint-Avé (8)
125.	Rah-Koëd Plaudren FC (9)	3–1	EFC Saint-Jean Brévelay (8)
126.	FC Saint-Perreux (9)	0–2	Elvinoise Foot (7)
127.	ES Larré-Molac (10)	2–1	Saint-Sébastien Caden (9)
128.	La Patriote Malansac (8)	1–2	Muzillac OS (8)
129.	Montagnards Sulniac (9)	2–2 (2–4 p)	AS Monterblanc (9)
130.	US Saint-Melaine Rieux (8)	0–2	Séné FC (6)
131.	Bogue D'Or Questembert (8)	0–5	Avenir Theix (7)
132.	JF Noyal-Muzillac (9)	3–2	Ajoncs d'Or Saint-Nolff (10)
133.	US Perros-Louannec (7)	1–1 (3–4 p)	Stade Paimpolais FC (6)
134.	AS Pleubian-Pleumeur (9)	0–6	CS Bégard (6)
135.	JS Lanvollon (8)	1–0	Entente du Trieux FC (9)
136.	US Ploubezre (9)	4–0	US Tréglamus (10)
137.	AS Ploumilliau (9)	6–1	CS Rospez (10)
138.	Breizh Olympique Caouënnec-Lanvézéac (10)	0–1	FC Trébeurden-Pleumeur-Bodou (8)
139.	FC La Chapelle-Neuve (11)	3–4	Union Squiffiec-Trégonneau (9)
140.	AS Trédrez-Locquémeau (8)	4–1	Avenir du Goëlo (8)
141.	Trégor FC (8)	1–5	AS Servel-Lannion (9)
142.	AS Tagarine (12)	3–0	US Trieux-Lézardrieux-Pleudaniel (9)
143.	US Plouisy (8)	1–2	FC Plouagat-Châtelaudren-Lanrodec (9)
144.	Association Mahoraise Guingamp (9)	0–2	US Goudelin (7)
145.	Goëlo FC (8)	2–6	RC Ploumagoar (7)
146.	AS Kérien-Magoar (10)	1–7	AS Grâces (8)
147.	FC Le Vieux Bourg (11)	0–2	AS Uzel-Merléac (7)
148.	AS Saint-Barnabé (10)	0–2	Rostrenen FC (8)
149.	US Argoat-Pélem (10)	0–1	FC La Croix-Corlay (8)
150.	FC Lié (8)	11–0	Étoile Sud Armor Porhoët (9)
151.	Saint-Brandan-Quintin FC (7)	1–0	CS Plédran (8)
152.	US Saint-Donan (10)	0–10	Plérin FC (7)
153.	ASL Saint-Julien (10)	1–0	US Saint-Carreuc-Hénon (8)
154.	ALSL Plémy (10)	0–3	Plaintel SF (7)
155.	Ploufragan FC (7)	2–1	Évron FC (8)
156.	ES Penguily (8)	2–4	US Quessoy (6)
157.	CS Lanrelas (9)	0–4	Loudéac OSC (6)
158.	CS Merdrignac (8)	1–1 (4–5 p)	AS Broons-Trémeur (9)
159.	US Erquy (9)	0–8	Lamballe FC (6)
160.	US Frémur-Fresnaye (7)	0–2	US Langueux (6)
161.	RC Dinan (12)	0–1	Plancoët-Arguenon FC (7)
162.	US Hunaudaye (9)	1–4	AS Ginglin Cesson (6)
163.	Stade Évrannais (8)	2–2 (2–4 p)	US Lanvallay (9)
164.	JS Cavan (8)	0–3	CO Briochin Sportif Ploufraganais (7)
165.	Val d'Arguenon Créhen-Pluduno (8)	2–1	FC Beaussais-Rance-Frémur (9)
166.	AL Trélat-Taden (11)	2–7	AS Bobital-Brusvily (9)
167.	FC Côte de Penthièvre (10)	2–1	FC Plélan Vildé Corseul (9)

=== Third round ===
These matches were played on 19 and 20 September 2020.

Third round results: Brittany
Tie no	Home team (tier)	Score	Away team (tier)
1.	AS Monterblanc (9)	4–2	Paotred du Tarun (10)
2.	Enfants de Guer (7)	1–0	Plouhinec FC (8)
3.	US Saint-Abraham Chapelle-Caro (9)	2–4	AS Bélugas Belz (8)
4.	Stiren Cléguer FC (9)	1–0	Avenir Campénéac Augan (10)
5.	US La Gacilly (7)	1–2	Muzillac OS (8)
6.	Saint-Efflam Kervignac (8)	5–0	JF Noyal-Muzillac (9)
7.	SC Sournais (9)	0–11	US Montagnarde (6)
8.	US Poullaouen (10)	0–7	AS Ploumilliau (9)
9.	Gourlizon Sport (8)	0–3	Plouzané AC (5)
10.	AS Plomelin (8)	1–4	Amicale Ergué-Gabéric (8)
11.	Indépendante Mauronnaise (9)	5–1	CS Pluméliau (8)
12.	AS Cruguel (8)	0–12	GSI Pontivy (5)
13.	Ruffiac-Malestroit (8)	6–1	Ajoncs d'Or Saint-Malguénac (9)
14.	FC Naizin (8)	0–0 (3–4 p)	Stade Guémenois (9)
15.	Avenir du Pays Pourleth (9)	2–3	FC Ploemeur (7)
16.	Baud FC (8)	1–1 (4–2 p)	Stade Pontivyen (5)
17.	Carnac FC (9)	0–4	Elvinoise Foot (7)
18.	ES Larré-Molac (10)	1–0	Avenir Theix (7)
19.	Rah-Koëd Plaudren FC (9)	0–7	AS Ménimur (7)
20.	Riantec OC (8)	1–2	Saint-Colomban Sportive Locminé (5)
21.	AS Lanester (8)	3–2	FC Basse Vilaine (8)
22.	Paotred Briec (8)	3–4	Dernières Cartouches Carhaix (8)
23.	Hermine Concarnoise (8)	0–1	AS Plobannalec-Lesconil (6)
24.	US Trégunc (6)	2–0	FC Quimperlois (7)
25.	Landi FC (7)	2–3	AL Coataudon (8)
26.	AS Landeda (9)	0–3	Saint-Pierre de Milizac (5)
27.	US Mespaul (11)	1–4	ASPTT Brest (7)
28.	US Cléder (8)	0–0 (4–3 p)	AS Dirinon (8)
29.	Gars de Plouénan (9)	1–2	ES Saint-Thégonnec (7)
30.	Arzelliz Ploudalmézeau (9)	1–0	ES Locmaria-Plouzané (9)
31.	EF Plougourvest (9)	0–2	EA Saint-Renan (6)
32.	AS Saint-Martin-des-Champs (8)	1–4	Espérance Plouguerneau (7)
33.	US Pencran (10)	0–5	AG Plouvorn (7)
34.	AS Plouvien (8)	1–3	Landerneau FC (6)
35.	Étoile Saint Laurent (7)	0–2	Guipavas GdR (6)
36.	Avenir Guiscriff (9)	0–4	La Plozévetienne (8)
37.	Saint-Thois Sports (11)	1–4	AS Diables du Juch (10)
38.	Stade Mellacois (9)	3–2	US Quimperloise (9)
39.	Stella Maris Douarnenez (6)	3–2	Châteaulin FC (6)
40.	EA Scaër (7)	0–1	US Moëlan (7)
41.	PB Spézet (9)	0–3	Quimper Kerfeunteun FC (7)
42.	FC Penn-ar-Bed (9)	1–3	Plougastel FC (7)
43.	Glaziks de Coray (8)	4–1	US Quimperoise (7)
44.	FC Lampaulais (9)	1–1 (4–5 p)	Gars de Saint-Yves (7)
45.	AS Scrignac (8)	2–2 (4–5 p)	RC Lesnevien (7)
46.	US Gosné (9)	0–4	FC Dinardais (7)
47.	Stade Saint-Aubinais (8)	0–5	US Liffré (6)
48.	FC Atlantique Vilaine (6)	0–1	AS Vitré (5)
49.	AS Jacques Cartier (8)	0–8	OC Cesson (6)
50.	RC Rannée-La Guerche-Drouges (7)	2–1	AS Chantepie (8)
51.	Jeunesse Combourgeoise (7)	1–2	ASC Romagné (8)
52.	Cercle Paul Bert Bréquigny (7)	1–0	Noyal-Brécé FC (8)
53.	US Billé-Javené (7)	0–6	Fougères AGLD (5)
54.	CO Pacéen (7)	0–3	FC Aubinois (8)
55.	FC Hermitage-Chapelle-Cintré (7)	3–0	US Laillé (7)
56.	AS La Gouesnière (8)	3–1	AS Vignoc-Hédé-Guipel (6)
57.	FC Breteil-Talensac (6)	0–3	TA Rennes (5)
58.	FC Mordelles (9)	0–1	US Saint-Gilles (7)
59.	Cadets Chelun Martigné-Ferchaud (9)	1–1 (8–9 p)	FC Guichen (6)
60.	Indépendante Saint-Georges-de-Chesné (9)	1–1 (10–9 p)	US Grégorienne (7)
61.	Espérance La Bouëxière (9)	1–3	OC Montauban (7)
62.	US Saint-Marc/Saint-Ouen (10)	1–5 (Note: Tie reversed since original draw.)	FC Tinténiac-Saint-Domineuc (9)
63.	US Gaël Muel (10)	1–6	FC Guipry Messac (5)
64.	Haute Vilaine FC (10)	1–3	Eskouadenn de Brocéliande (7)
65.	FC Bruz (8)	0–0 (6–5 p)	SC Le Rheu (6)
66.	Cadets de Bains (7)	4–3	AS Retiers-Coësmes (8)
67.	AS Servel-Lannion (9)	2–0	US Ploubezre (9)
68.	JS Lanvollon (8)	1–7	AS Ginglin Cesson (6)
69.	FC Côte de Penthièvre (10)	0–10	Dinan-Léhon FC (5)
70.	FC La Croix-Corlay (8)	1–4	US Quessoy (6)
71.	FC Lié (8)	2–1	Val d'Arguenon Créhen-Pluduno (8)
72.	CO Briochin Sportif Ploufraganais (7)	3–2	Rostrenen FC (8)
73.	US Lanvallay (9)	1–1 (1–4 p)	ASL Saint-Julien (10)
74.	FC Quiberon Saint-Pierre (8)	0–12	Séné FC (6)
75.	AS Moustoir-Ac (9)	0–5	Keriolets de Pluvigner (6)
76.	Semeurs de Grand-Champ (9)	0–4	Ploërmel FC (6)
77.	Garde Saint-Eloi Kerfourn (9)	0–4	Moutons Blanc de Noyal-Pontivy (7)
78.	AS Bobital-Brusvily (9)	0–10	Lamballe FC (6)
79.	AS Broons-Trémeur (9)	0–4	Plancoët-Arguenon FC (7)
80.	AS Trédrez-Locquémeau (8)	0–4	Lannion FC (5)
81.	US Goudelin (7)	8–3	FC Trébeurden-Pleumeur-Bodou (8)
82.	Plérin FC (7)	3–2	RC Ploumagoar (7)
83.	AS Tagarine (12)	1–1 (5–4 p)	Union Squiffiec-Trégonneau (9)
84.	US Langueux (6)	3–0	Stade Paimpolais FC (6)
85.	CS Bégard (6)	2–1	Saint-Brandan-Quintin FC (7)
86.	AS Grâces (8)	1–0	FC Plouagat-Châtelaudren-Lanrodec (9)
87.	Loudéac OSC (6)	1–0	Ploufragan FC (7)
88.	AS Uzel-Merléac (7)	1–1 (4–3 p)	Plaintel SF (7)
89.	US Arradon (8)	3–3 (7–8 p)	US Brech (8)

=== Fourth round ===
These matches were played on 3 and 4 October 2020, with one postponed until 11 October 2020.

Fourth round results: Brittany
Tie no	Home team (tier)	Score	Away team (tier)
1.	RC Lesnevien (7)	1–0	Glaziks de Coray (8)
2.	AG Plouvorn (7)	0–5	Stade Plabennécois (4)
3.	Landerneau FC (6)	3–5	Stella Maris Douarnenez (6)
4.	ES Saint-Thégonnec (7)	2–2 (6–7 p)	AL Coataudon (8)
5.	Gars de Saint-Yves (7)	3–1	US Moëlan (7)
6.	Espérance Plouguerneau (7)	2–3	AS Plobannalec-Lesconil (6)
7.	AS Ploumilliau (9)	2–2 (2–4 p)	Plougastel FC (7)
8.	Dernières Cartouches Carhaix (8)	3–4	US Trégunc (6)
9.	Stade Mellacois (9)	1–4	Lannion FC (5)
10.	Amicale Ergué-Gabéric (8)	0–3	Plouzané AC (5)
11.	US Cléder (8)	2–0	AS Servel-Lannion (9)
12.	Guipavas GdR (6)	2–0	ASPTT Brest (7)
13.	AS Diables du Juch (10)	0–1	Arzelliz Ploudalmézeau (9)
14.	EA Saint-Renan (6)	1–1 (5–3 p)	Quimper Kerfeunteun FC (7)
15.	La Plozévetienne (8)	0–4	Saint-Pierre de Milizac (5)
16.	Keriolets de Pluvigner (6)	0–0 (3–4 p)	Cadets de Bains (7)
17.	AS Ménimur (7)	4–0	AS Lanester (8)
18.	Stiren Cléguer FC (9)	0–0 (9–8 p)	ES Larré-Molac (10)
19.	Stade Guémenois (9)	0–5	FC Guichen (6)
20.	US Brech (8)	1–2	Baud FC (8)
21.	Moutons Blanc de Noyal-Pontivy (7)	1–1 (3–4 p)	FC Guipry Messac (5)
22.	Séné FC (6)	1–0	RC Rannée-La Guerche-Drouges (7)
23.	Enfants de Guer (7)	1–4	Saint-Colomban Sportive Locminé (5)
24.	Saint-Efflam Kervignac (8)	1–4	FC Bruz (8)
25.	Ruffiac-Malestroit (8)	0–3	US Montagnarde (6)
26.	GSI Pontivy (5)	1–2	Vannes OC (4)
27.	Elvinoise Foot (7)	2–0	Eskouadenn de Brocéliande (7)
28.	Ploërmel FC (6)	3–1	FC Ploemeur (7)
29.	Indépendante Mauronnaise (9)	4–1	AS Monterblanc (9)
30.	AS Bélugas Belz (8)	2–2 (4–5 p)	Cercle Paul Bert Bréquigny (7)
31.	Muzillac OS (8)	2–2 (3–4 p)	AS Vitré (5)
32.	AS Tagarine (12)	3–2	Indépendante Saint-Georges-de-Chesné (9)
33.	AS Grâces (8)	0–5	US Saint-Malo (4)
34.	FC Tinténiac-Saint-Domineuc (9)	2–2 (3–4 p)	Plancoët-Arguenon FC (7)
35.	Fougères AGLD (5)	2–1	TA Rennes (5)
36.	FC Lié (8)	2–2 (6–7 p)	Lamballe FC (6)
37.	ASC Romagné (8)	0–3	OC Cesson (6)
38.	OC Montauban (7)	2–2 (3–4 p)	Plérin FC (7)
39.	AS Ginglin Cesson (6)	1–1 (5–3 p)	CO Briochin Sportif Ploufraganais (7)
40.	AS La Gouesnière (8)	0–3	US Liffré (6)
41.	US Saint-Gilles (7)	1–3	Dinan-Léhon FC (5)
42.	FC Aubinois (8)	2–2 (5–3 p)	US Langueux (6)
43.	US Goudelin (7)	0–5	Loudéac OSC (6)
44.	ASL Saint-Julien (10)	1–3	FC Dinardais (7)
45.	US Quessoy (6)	1–1 (3–4 p)	AS Uzel-Merléac (7)
46.	CS Bégard (6)	2–2 (3–1 p)	FC Hermitage-Chapelle-Cintré (7)

=== Fifth round ===
These matches were played on 17 and 18 October 2020, with three postponed until 25 October 2020.

Fifth round results: Brittany
Tie no	Home team (tier)	Score	Away team (tier)
1.	Guipavas GdR (6)	1–1 (1–3 p)	Gars de Saint-Yves (7)
2.	FC Bruz (8)	0–1	AS Ginglin Cesson (6)
3.	Fougères AGLD (5)	0–1	Stade Briochin (3)
4.	FC Dinardais (7)	2–0	AS Vitré (5)
5.	Cadets de Bains (7)	1–4	Plérin FC (7)
6.	Cercle Paul Bert Bréquigny (7)	0–0 (3–4 p)	US Liffré (6)
7.	AS Tagarine (12)	0–6	Lamballe FC (6)
8.	Loudéac OSC (6)	1–4	FC Guichen (6)
9.	OC Cesson (6)	2–1	Plancoët-Arguenon FC (7)
10.	Elvinoise Foot (7)	0–0 (3–1 p)	Ploërmel FC (6)
11.	AS Uzel-Merléac (7)	0–0 (4–2 p)	FC Guipry Messac (5)
12.	Indépendante Mauronnaise (9)	0–9	US Saint-Malo (4)
13.	FC Aubinois (8)	0–4	Dinan-Léhon FC (5)
14.	Stella Maris Douarnenez (6)	1–3	EA Saint-Renan (6)
15.	Arzelliz Ploudalmézeau (9)	0–0 (4–5 p)	Saint-Pierre de Milizac (5)
16.	Baud FC (8)	1–5	Stade Plabennécois (4)
17.	Stiren Cléguer FC (9)	1–8	CS Bégard (6)
18.	AS Ménimur (7)	0–1	Saint-Colomban Sportive Locminé (5)
19.	Plouzané AC (5)	6–0	Séné FC (6)
20.	Lannion FC (5)	1–1 (2–4 p)	Vannes OC (4)
21.	AL Coataudon (8)	0–0 (4–2 p)	US Cléder (8)
22.	Plougastel FC (7)	1–1 (4–3 p)	RC Lesnevien (7)
23.	US Trégunc (6)	0–0 (2–3 p)	AS Plobannalec-Lesconil (6)
24.	US Montagnarde (6)	0–0 (4–3 p)	US Concarneau (3)

=== Sixth round ===
These matches were played on 31 January 2021.

Sixth round results: Brittany
Tie no	Home team (tier)	Score	Away team (tier)
1.	Gars de Saint-Yves (7)	0–3 (Note: Gars de Saint-Yves forfeited the tie, stating they would not play under the current conditions relating to COVID-19.)	Stade Briochin (3)
2.	Plougastel FC (7)	0–0 (5–6 p)	Vannes OC (4)
3.	AS Ginglin Cesson (6)	0–4	US Saint-Malo (4)
4.	Plérin FC (7)	2–2 (9–10 p)	Stade Plabennécois (4)
5.	AL Coataudon (8)	1–2	US Liffré (6)
6.	US Montagnarde (6)	1–0	Elvinoise Foot (7)
7.	Saint-Pierre de Milizac (5)	1–1 (4–3 p)	Lamballe FC (6)
8.	Dinan-Léhon FC (5)	1–0	OC Cesson (6)
9.	FC Dinardais (7)	1–1 (6–7 p)	Saint-Colomban Sportive Locminé (5)
10.	CS Bégard (6)	0–3	Plouzané AC (5)
11.	FC Guichen (6)	6–4	AS Uzel-Merléac (7)
12.	AS Plobannalec-Lesconil (6)	1–5	EA Saint-Renan (6)
