= 2016–17 Coupe de France preliminary rounds, Bretagne =

The 2016–17 Coupe de France preliminary rounds, Bretagne made up the qualifying competition to decide which teams from the Brittany leagues took part in the main competition from round 7. This was the 100th season of the French football cup competition. The competition was organised by the French Football Federation (FFF) and is open to all clubs in French football, as well as clubs from the overseas departments and territories (Guadeloupe, French Guiana, Martinique, Mayotte, New Caledonia (qualification via 2016 New Caledonia Cup), Tahiti (qualification via 2016 Tahiti Cup), Réunion, and Saint Martin).

The qualifying rounds took place between August and October 2016.

== Second round ==
These matches were played on 28 August 2016.

Second round results: Bretagne

| Tie no | Home team (tier) | Score | Away team (tier) |
|---|---|---|---|
| 1. | Stade Kénanais (13) | 1–7 | Entente du Trieux FC (11) |
| 2. | JA Penvénan (11) | 0–2 | US Perros-Louannec (9) |
| 3. | CS Rospez (12) | 0–2 | US Ploubezre (10) |
| 4. | AS Trédrez-Locquémeau (12) | 3–2 | JS Cavan (10) |
| 5. | FC Trébeurden-Pleumeur-Bodou (10) | 2–1 | AS Servel-Lannion (9) |
| 6. | US Pays Rochois (12) | 2–1 | US Pluzunet-Tonquédec (12) |
| 7. | US Trémel (11) | 1–12 | CS Bégard (8) |
| 8. | AS Pleubian-Pleumeur (10) | 1–4 | Stade Paimpolais FC (7) |
| 9. | ES Ploubazlanec (10) | 2–0 | Trégor FC (9) |
| 10. | Écureuils de Plourivo (11) | 0–2 | JS Lanvollon (9) |
| 11. | US Méné Bré (13) | 0–4 | US Plouisy (10) |
| 12. | US Goudelin (11) | 0–1 | FC Plouagat-Châtelaudren-Lanrodec (10) |
| 13. | ES Pommerit-Le Merzer (11) | 1–2 | AS Grâces (8) |
| 14. | US St Donan (13) | 2–3 | ES Le Fœil (12) |
| 15. | US Callac (11) | 5–2 | AS Kérien-Magoar (12) |
| 16. | Étoile du Leff (12) | 1–2 | RC Ploumagoar (10) |
| 17. | US St Nicolas-du-Pélem (11) | 1–2 | Rostrenen FC (9) |
| 18. | St Brandan-Quintin FC (11) | 4–0 | AS Blavet (12) |
| 19. | ASL St Julien (10) | 3–0 | US Plouguernével (11) |
| 20. | FC La Croix-Corlay (12) | 0–1 | Loudéac OSC (9) |
| 21. | FC Poulancre-Múr-St Gilles (11) | 1–0 | AS St Barnabé (12) |
| 22. | CS Merdrignac (10) | 0–1 | AS Uzel-Merléac (8) |
| 23. | Étoile Sud Armor Porhoët (11) | 1–1 (3–2 p) | AS Motterieux (11) |
| 24. | FC Lié (11) | 1–3 | US Plessala (10) |
| 25. | AS Trégueux (11) | 0–1 | AS Trémuson (9) |
| 26. | Pordic-Binic FC (10) | 1–4 | Plérin FC (9) |
| 27. | CS Croix Lambert (11) | 3–2 | AS Hillion-St René (9) |
| 28. | Coëtmieux Pommeret FC (10) | 1–3 | AS Ginglin Cesson (8) |
| 29. | Évron FC (10) | 1–3 | Plaintel SF (8) |
| 30. | AS Trébry (11) | 0–3 | CS Plédran (8) |
| 31. | Entente des Lacs FC (12) | 0–1 | La Plœucoise Foot (12) |
| 32. | ES Penguily (10) | 1–2 | CO Briochin Sportif Ploufraganais (8) |
| 33. | AS Broons-Trémeur (11) | 0–5 | US Langueux (7) |
| 34. | US Trémorel (11) | 0–3 | US Quessoy (9) |
| 35. | FC Pays de Plélan Vildé (10) | 2–3 (a.e.t.) | Ploufragan FC (7) |
| 36. | Stade Évrannais (11) | 0–3 | Stade Pleudihennais (9) |
| 37. | ES St Cast-le-Guildo (12) | 1–2 | US Frémur-Fresnaye (8) |
| 38. | CS Lanrelas (11) | 1–5 | AS Trélivan (9) |
| 39. | US Plouasne-St Juvat (11) | 3–0 | AS Plédéliac (10) |
| 40. | US Erquy (10) | 1–3 | Lamballe FC (7) |
| 41. | Val d'Arguenon Créhen-Pluduno (12) | 1–3 | US Brusvily (11) |
| 42. | AS Bobital (11) | 0–7 | La Plancoëtine (8) |
| 43. | AL Coataudon (11) | 1–2 | Étoile St Laurent (9) |
| 44. | US Plougonvelin (11) | 2–2 (1–2 p) | Plougastel FC (9) |
| 45. | Avel Vor St Pabu (12) | 2–3 | JS St Thonanaise (12) |
| 46. | Étoile St Edern (11) | 6–2 | Hermine Kernilis (12) |
| 47. | ASPTT Brest (10) | 2–1 | St Pierre Milizac (8) |
| 48. | ES Portsall Kersaint (10) | 2–7 | EA St Renan (8) |
| 49. | AS Guilers (11) | 2–5 | Vie au Grand Air Bohars (9) |
| 50. | SC Lannilis (10) | 5–1 | Légion St Pierre (10) |
| 51. | AS Sizun-Le Tréhou (11) | 4–1 | FA de la Rade (11) |
| 52. | AS Berven-Plouzévédé (11) | 2–4 | FC Lanhouarneau-Plounévez-Lochrist (10) |
| 53. | CND Le Folgoët (10) | 0–1 | Guipavas GdR (7) |
| 54. | AS Plouvien (10) | 4–2 | AS Landeda (10) |
| 55. | ES Plounéventer (12) | 3–4 | ES Cranou (12) |
| 56. | FC Gouesnou (8) | 0–1 | RC Lesnevien (8) |
| 57. | St Divy Sports (10) | 1–2 | Bodilis-Plougar FC (9) |
| 58. | Étoile St Yves Ploudaniel (8) | 2–0 | Espérance Plouguerneau (9) |
| 59. | AS St Vougay (12) | 1–5 | FC Le Relecq-Kerhuon (9) |
| 60. | Paotred Rosko (11) | 1–3 | Stade Léonard Kreisker (11) |
| 61. | ES Lampaulaise (11) | 3–1 | US Morlaix (11) |
| 62. | Avenir Plourin (11) | 1–0 | AS St Martin-des-Champs (8) |
| 63. | Landi FC (9) | 2–1 | AG Plouvorn (7) |
| 64. | ES Pleyber-Christ (12) | 0–4 | ES St Thégonnec (9) |
| 65. | Gars de la Rive (12) | 1–4 | Landerneau FC (8) |
| 66. | US Lanmeur-Plouégat-Guérand (10) | 0–5 | SC Morlaix (8) |
| 67. | ES Carantec-Henvic (11) | 2–2 (6–5 p) | JU Plougonven (9) |
| 68. | AS Scrignac (10) | 2–1 (a.e.t.) | AS Santec (11) |
| 69. | ES Beuzec (12) | 3–1 | Racing Cast-Porzay (12) |
| 70. | Lanvéoc Sports (11) | 2–1 | AS Plouhinécoise (9) |
| 71. | FC Penn-ar-Bed (12) | 2–3 | JS Plogastel (11) |
| 72. | AS Telgruc-sur-Mer (11) | 1–4 | Stella Maris Douarnenez (8) |
| 73. | Gas d'Ys Tréboul (11) | 0–3 | La Plozévetienne (8) |
| 74. | Gourlizon Sport (11) | 0–1 | Gas du Menez-Hom (11) |
| 75. | AS Camaretoise (11) | 1–3 | ES Plogonnec (11) |
| 76. | ES Malahon-Confort (12) | 1–4 | US Crozon-Morgat (11) |
| 77. | US Châteauneuf-du-Faou (11) | 0–5 | Châteaulin FC (8) |
| 78. | PB Spézet (10) | 2–1 (a.e.t.) | Stade Pleybennois (11) |
| 79. | Gars de Plonévez-du-Faou (12) | 1–9 | Dernières Cartouches Carhaix (10) |
| 80. | US Lennon (13) | 3–1 | Tricolores Landrévarzec (12) |
| 81. | St Goazec (12) | 0–2 | ES Langolen (12) |
| 82. | Glaziks de Coray (10) | 1–1 (3–1 p) | Gourin FC (9) |
| 83. | Paotred Briec (11) | 6–2 | US Cléhen-Poher (12) |
| 84. | US Kergloff (12) | 2–2 (5–4 p) | US Poullaouen (11) |
| 85. | Stade Mellacois (11) | 1–5 | FC Quimperlois (7) |
| 86. | Fleur de Genêt Bannalec (11) | 1–3 | AS Melgven (9) |
| 87. | US Moëlan (10) | 1–5 | US Trégunc (7) |
| 88. | US Querrien (12) | 0–4 | ES Névez (12) |
| 89. | ES Rédené (12) | 2–3 (a.e.t.) | EA Scaër (10) |
| 90. | Hermine Concarnoise (11) | 3–2 | US Quimperlé (10) |
| 91. | AS Baye (11) | 0–5 | US Clohars-Carnoët (9) |
| 92. | Quimper Kerfeunteun FC (9) | 1–2 | US Fouesnant (8) |
| 93. | Amicale Ergué-Gabéric (10) | 1–5 | AS Plobannalec-Lesconil (7) |
| 94. | Marcassins Sportif Tréogat (12) | 2–2 (5–4 p) | FC Quimper Penhars (10) |
| 95. | US St Évarzec (11) | 3–0 | US Pluguffan (11) |
| 96. | FC Odet (10) | 2–0 | FC Treffiagat-Guilvinec (11) |
| 97. | Plonéour FC (10) | 1–0 | FC Pont-l'Abbé (8) |
| 98. | FC Turc Quimper (12) | 0–3 | FC Pleuvennois (11) |
| 99. | US Île-Tudy (12) | 0–5 | Cormorans Sportif de Penmarc'h (9) |
| 100. | AS Plomelin (9) | 1–3 | Quimper Italia FC (9) |
| 101. | Gars de St Yves (9) | 1–6 | AS Brest (8) |
| 102. | FC La Mézière-Melesse (11) | 3–5 | Jeunesse Combourgesse (8) |
| 103. | AS Miniac-Morvan (11) | 2–0 | La Mélorienne (12) |
| 104. | AS Ercé-près-Liffré (11) | 0–6 | AS Vignoc-Hédé-Guipel (8) |
| 105. | US Baguer-Morvan (11) | 0–1 | AS Jacques Cartier (9) |
| 106. | FC Meillac-Lanhélin-Bonnemain (11) | 3–1 | JS Picanaise (12) |
| 107. | La Cancalaise (11) | 0–5 | US St Jouan-des-Guérets (8) |
| 108. | FC Bord de Rance (12) | 1–4 | Cercle Jules Ferry (10) |
| 109. | FC Plerguer/Roz-Landrieux (12) | 1–3 | Entente Samsonnaise Doloise (9) |
| 110. | US Château-Malo (10) | 0–1 | FC Dinardais (8) |
| 111. | Indépendante St Georges-de-Chesné (10) | 1–0 | CS Betton (9) |
| 112. | FC Louvigné-La Bazouge (11) | 1–5 | US Liffré (9) |
| 113. | US Gosné (11) | 1–2 (a.e.t.) | CS Servon (8) |
| 114. | La Chapelle-Fleurigné-Laignelet-Le Loroux (11) | 1–5 | La Vitréenne FC (7) |
| 115. | FC Aubinois (11) | 4–2 | ASC Romagné (9) |
| 116. | Entente Parigné/Landéan (11) | 0–2 | ES St Germain/Montours (9) |
| 117. | US Billé-Javené (11) | 0–2 | FC Stéphanais Briçois (10) |
| 118. | FC Des Landes (12) | 2–4 | ASE Lécousse (10) |
| 119. | US Gévezé (10) | 1–3 | US Grégorienne (8) |
| 120. | FC Tinténiac-St Domineuc (12) | 1–2 | CO Pacéen (9) |
| 121. | US Bédée-Pleumeleuc (11) | 0–7 | FC La Chapelle-Montgermont (7) |
| 122. | AS Parthenay-de-Bretagne (13) | 2–1 | Avenir Irodouër (11) |
| 123. | US St Gilles (11) | 0–4 | US St Méen-St Onen (9) |
| 124. | Hermitage AC (10) | 1–2 (a.e.t.) | AS Chantepie (8) |
| 125. | Montfort-Iffendic (12) | 0–2 | OC Montauban (8) |
| 126. | US Mordelles (10) | 2–5 | FC Breteil-Talensac (9) |
| 127. | USC Chavagne (11) | 1–2 | Eskouadenn de Brocéliande (10) |
| 128. | US Pont-Péan (11) | 0–2 | Espérance Chartres-de-Bretagne (9) |
| 129. | US Guignen (11) | 0–0 (4–2 p) | US Noyal-Chatillon (10) |
| 130. | Espérance Sixt-sur-Aff (11) | 0–3 | Cadets de Bains (9) |
| 131. | US Bourgbarré (11) | 2–3 | SC Le Rheu (8) |
| 132. | SC St Senoux (11) | 1–6 | FC Guipry-Messac (8) |
| 133. | US Bel Air (10) | 1–3 (a.e.t.) | AS St Jacques (11) |
| 134. | FC Baulon-Lassy (11) | 0–3 | FC Bruz (9) |
| 135. | US Laillé (10) | 0–1 | Espérance de Rennes (9) |
| 136. | Reveil Seglinois (12) | 0–2 | US Bain (10) |
| 137. | Cercle Paul Bert Gayeulles (11) | 1–0 | Noyal-Brécé FC (8) |
| 138. | US Val d'Izé (10) | 2–0 | Domloup Sport (9) |
| 139. | US Janzé (10) | 1–0 | Jeunes d'Argentré (7) |
| 140. | US Vern-sur-Seiche (11) | 0–5 | Stade Louvignéen (9) |
| 141. | Châteaubourg FC (13) | 1–1 (2–4 p) | AS Retiers (8) |
| 142. | JA Balazé (10) | 3–3 (2–4 p) | RC Rannée-La Guerche-Drouges (7) |
| 143. | US Domagné-St Didier (11) | 1–2 | ES Thorigné-Fouillard (10) |
| 144. | Bleuets Le Pertre-Brielles-Gennes-St Cyr (11) | 0–1 | US Acigné (10) |
| 145. | US Châteaugiron (10) | 3–0 | OC Brétillien (13) |
| 146. | Haute Vilaine FC (11) | 4–6 (a.e.t.) | Stade St Aubinais (10) |
| 147. | AS Bubry (11) | 1–1 (5–4 p) | Melrand Sports (12) |
| 148. | FC Kerzec (11) | 2–4 | FOLC Lorient Ouest (8) |
| 149. | US Langoelan (13) | 0–5 | Avenir Guiscriff (11) |
| 150. | FC Klegereg (10) | 3–0 | FC Gueltas-St Gérand-St Gonnery (11) |
| 151. | FC Naizin (10) | 0–5 | Stade Pontivyen (7) |
| 152. | CS Pluméliau (10) | 1–6 | Keriolets de Pluvigner (8) |
| 153. | Espérance Bréhan (11) | 4–2 | Garde St Cyr Moréac (9) |
| 154. | Bleuets Néant-sur-Yvel (12) | 0–1 | Garde St Eloi Kerfourn (11) |
| 155. | US St Abraham Chapelle-Caro (10) | 1–4 | Moutons Blanc de Noyal-Pontivy (8) |
| 156. | Avenir St Servant-sur-Oust (10) | 1–2 | Séné FC (8) |
| 157. | CS St Gaudence Allaire (12) | 3–1 | Espoir St Jacut-les-Pins (11) |
| 158. | FC Cournon (12) | 2–3 (a.e.t.) | La Patriote Malansac (11) |
| 159. | Enfants de Guer (10) | 0–1 | Ploërmel FC (7) |
| 160. | Brocéliande Campénéac (11) | 1–6 | US La Gacilly (8) |
| 161. | Fondelienne Carentoir (12) | 0–3 | Indépendante Mauronnaise (10) |
| 162. | St Sébastien Caden (10) | 0–4 | Avenir Theix (8) |
| 163. | FC Basse Vilaine (10) | 2–1 | Montagnards Sulniac (11) |
| 164. | Ruffiac-Malestroit (10) | 4–1 | St Jean Sport (11) |
| 165. | JF Noyal-Muzillac (11) | 0–2 | Muzillac OS (9) |
| 166. | Armoricaine Péaule (10) | 3–1 | Gentienne Pluherlin (11) |
| 167. | Bleuets Crédin (12) | 1–4 | CS Bignan (9) |
| 168. | CS Pluneret (11) | 1–2 | AGG Locmariaquer (12) |
| 169. | Avenir Plumergat (13) | 0–3 | AS Plougoumelen-Bono (11) |
| 170. | Landaul Sports (10) | 1–2 | CEP Lorient (8) |
| 171. | Riantec OC (10) | 1–2 | FC Quiberon St Pierre (8) |
| 172. | Garde du Pont Marzan (10) | 4–2 (a.e.t.) | Elvinoise Foot (9) |
| 173. | AS Priziac (12) | 1–0 | FC Kerchopine (11) |
| 174. | Stade Guémenois (12) | 1–3 | JA Arzano (11) |
| 175. | US Le Faouët (11) | 0–2 | Caudan SF (10) |
| 176. | CS Josselin (12) | 3–0 | Enfants de St Gildas (11) |
| 177. | Garde de la Mi-Voie (12) | 0–3 | AS Cruguel (9) |
| 178. | Ajoncs d'Or St Nolff (12) | 2–0 | AS Ménimur (9) |
| 179. | Cadets de Guéhenno (12) | 1–5 | Guénin Sport (11) |
| 180. | Rah-Koëd Plaudren FC (12) | 0–7 | ES St Avé (9) |
| 181. | US Arradon (10) | 1–0 | Bogue D'Or Questembert (9) |
| 182. | AS Meucon (11) | 3–1 (a.e.t.) | AG Arzal (12) |
| 183. | AL Camors (12) | 0–2 | AS Moustoir-Ac (11) |
| 184. | Plumelin Sports (10) | 1–5 | Baud FC (7) |
| 185. | Languidic FC (10) | 0–2 | US Goëlands de Larmor-Plage (7) |
| 186. | US Hennebont (12) | 1–3 | ES Ploemel (10) |
| 187. | AS Gestel (11) | 1–3 | Lorient Sports (9) |
| 188. | FC Quistinic (12) | 0–0 (6–7 p) | AS Lanester (10) |
| 189. | Fleur d'Ajonc Inzinzac (11) | 1–1 (5–4 p) | FC Plouay (9) |
| 190. | AS St Herve de Caro (12) | 0–3 | EFC St Jean Brévelay (11) |
| 191. | JA Pleucadeuc (12) | 0–2 | AS Monterblanc (11) |
| 192. | ES Crac'h (11) | 8–3 | Stade Gâvrais (12) |
| 193. | Garde du Loch (12) | 3–0 | ACS Outre Mer (12) |
| 194. | Erdeven-Étel (12) | 1–3 | AS Bélugas Belz (9) |
| 195. | AS Calanaise (12) | 0–7 | FC Ploemeur (9) |
| 196. | AS Kergonan (12) | 1–2 | ES Merlevenez (10) |
| 197. | ES Sud Outre Rade (9) | 5–4 | CS Quéven (10) |
| 198. | Espoir Clohars-Fouesnant (11) | 3–2 | Gars de Plomeur (11) |

== Third round ==
These matches were played on 10 and 11 September 2016.

Third round results: Bretagne

| Tie no | Home team (tier) | Score | Away team (tier) |
|---|---|---|---|
| 1. | AS Bubry (11) | 0–14 | Vannes OC (5) |
| 2. | US Plouasne-St Juvat (11) | 0–7 | Dinan-Léhon FC (5) |
| 3. | Dernières Cartouches Carhaix (10) | 3–2 (a.e.t.) | US St Évarzec (11) |
| 4. | AS Uzel-Merléac (8) | 0–4 | Stade Briochin (5) |
| 5. | Entente Samsonnaise Doloise (9) | 3–4 (a.e.t.) | Stade Pleudihennais (9) |
| 6. | US Val d'Izé (10) | 1–3 | FC Meillac-Lanhélin-Bonnemain (11) |
| 7. | CO Pacéen (9) | 1–0 | US St Jouan-des-Guérets (8) |
| 8. | FC Breteil-Talensac (9) | 3–2 | FC Dinardais (8) |
| 9. | AS Miniac-Morvan (11) | 1–0 | AS Vignoc-Hédé-Guipel (8) |
| 10. | US St Méen-St Onen (9) | 3–0 | FC Stéphanais Briçois (10) |
| 11. | ASE Lécousse (10) | 1–9 | Cercle Paul Bert Bréquigny (6) |
| 12. | AS Parthenay-de-Bretagne (13) | 0–4 | Jeunesse Combourgesse (8) |
| 13. | AS Jacques Cartier (9) | 0–1 | OC Cesson (6) |
| 14. | ES St Germain/Montours (9) | 0–4 | US Liffré (9) |
| 15. | Cercle Jules Ferry (10) | 1–0 | Indépendante St Georges-de-Chesné (10) |
| 16. | FC Aubinois (11) | 0–2 (a.e.t.) | FC La Chapelle-Montgermont (7) |
| 17. | US Grégorienne (8) | 1–5 | Fougères AGLD (5) |
| 18. | Stade St Aubinais (10) | 2–2 (4–3 p) | OC Montauban (8) |
| 19. | US Bain (10) | 2–5 | SC Le Rheu (8) |
| 20. | Cercle Paul Bert Gayeulles (11) | 1–5 | RC Rannée-La Guerche-Drouges (7) |
| 21. | AS St Jacques (11) | 1–3 | Espérance de Rennes (9) |
| 22. | US Acigné (10) | 3–1 | AS Retiers (8) |
| 23. | US Guignen (11) | 1–2 (a.e.t.) | Stade Louvignéen (9) |
| 24. | AS Chantepie (8) | 2–1 | Espérance Chartres-de-Bretagne (9) |
| 25. | Cadets de Bains (9) | 1–1 (2–4 p) | La Vitréenne FC (7) |
| 26. | CS Servon (8) | 0–1 | FC Guichen (6) |
| 27. | US Châteaugiron (10) | 0–3 | TA Rennes (5) |
| 28. | Eskouadenn de Brocéliande (10) | 1–3 | US Janzé (10) |
| 29. | ES Thorigné-Fouillard (10) | 2–1 (a.e.t.) | FC Atlantique Vilaine (6) |
| 30. | FC Guipry-Messac (8) | 3–0 | FC Bruz (9) |
| 31. | Landerneau FC (8) | 6–0 | Landi FC (9) |
| 32. | Stade Léonard Kreisker (11) | 0–1 | ES St Thégonnec (9) |
| 33. | SC Morlaix (8) | 3–1 | Bodilis-Plougar FC (9) |
| 34. | FC Lanhouarneau-Plounévez-Lochrist (10) | 3–1 | AS Scrignac (10) |
| 35. | Avenir Plourin (11) | 2–5 | Étoile St Yves Ploudaniel (8) |
| 36. | ES Carantec-Henvic (11) | 1–3 | ES Lampaulaise (11) |
| 37. | Étoile St Edern (11) | 0–3 | Guipavas GdR (7) |
| 38. | SC Lannilis (10) | 2–0 | RC Lesnevien (8) |
| 39. | AS Sizun-Le Tréhou (11) | 1–3 | Plouzané AC (6) |
| 40. | Étoile St Laurent (9) | 4–3 | Plougastel FC (9) |
| 41. | ES Cranou (12) | 0–4 | EA St Renan (8) |
| 42. | AS Plouvien (10) | 2–1 | AS Brest (8) |
| 43. | JS St Thonanaise (12) | 1–0 (a.e.t.) | Vie au Grand Air Bohars (9) |
| 44. | FC Le Relecq-Kerhuon (9) | 0–2 | ASPTT Brest (10) |
| 45. | AS Priziac (12) | 1–2 | Keriolets de Pluvigner (8) |
| 46. | JA Arzano (11) | 0–3 | US Montagnarde (6) |
| 47. | GSI Pontivy (6) | 4–0 | Ploërmel FC (7) |
| 48. | AS Meucon (11) | 0–6 | Stade Pontivyen (7) |
| 49. | CS Bignan (9) | 3–0 | ES Sud Outre Rade (9) |
| 50. | Garde du Loch (12) | 0–4 | ES St Avé (9) |
| 51. | AS Monterblanc (11) | 5–4 (a.e.t.) | Muzillac OS (9) |
| 52. | FC Quiberon St Pierre (8) | 2–3 (a.e.t.) | Baud FC (7) |
| 53. | Garde St Eloi Kerfourn (11) | 4–0 | CS St Gaudence Allaire (12) |
| 54. | La Patriote Malansac (11) | 2–0 | Avenir Guiscriff (11) |
| 55. | AS Lanester (10) | 1–0 | Moutons Blanc de Noyal-Pontivy (8) |
| 56. | Lorient Sports (9) | 1–3 | CEP Lorient (8) |
| 57. | ES Merlevenez (10) | 1–3 | FC Klegereg (10) |
| 58. | CS Josselin (12) | 2–1 (a.e.t.) | Garde du Pont Marzan (10) |
| 59. | AS Bélugas Belz (9) | 1–2 | Ruffiac-Malestroit (10) |
| 60. | AGG Locmariaquer (12) | 1–1 (3–5 p) | Ajoncs d'Or St Nolff (12) |
| 61. | Guénin Sport (11) | 0–0 (3–5 p) | Indépendante Mauronnaise (10) |
| 62. | AS Plougoumelen-Bono (11) | 2–0 | EFC St Jean Brévelay (11) |
| 63. | US Arradon (10) | 2–1 | FOLC Lorient Ouest (8) |
| 64. | Séné FC (8) | 2–1 | Avenir Theix (8) |
| 65. | FC Basse Vilaine (10) | 1–2 (a.e.t.) | US La Gacilly (8) |
| 66. | AS Moustoir-Ac (11) | 1–0 | Espérance Bréhan (11) |
| 67. | Armoricaine Péaule (10) | 2–3 | US Goëlands de Larmor-Plage (7) |
| 68. | FC Ploemeur (9) | 2–2 (3–4 p) | Saint-Colomban Sportive Locminé (6) |
| 69. | ES Crac'h (11) | 0–8 | Auray FC (6) |
| 70. | AS Cruguel (9) | 2–1 | ES Ploemel (10) |
| 71. | Caudan SF (10) | 1–3 | Fleur d'Ajonc Inzinzac (11) |
| 72. | FC Odet (10) | 0–0 (4–5 p) | Stella Maris Douarnenez (8) |
| 73. | US Crozon-Morgat (11) | 0–2 | Châteaulin FC (8) |
| 74. | JS Plogastel (11) | 1#4 | Cormorans Sportif de Penmarc'h (9) |
| 75. | Gas du Menez-Hom (11) | 4–2 (a.e.t.) | Lanvéoc Sports (11) |
| 76. | ES Plogonnec (11) | 1–2 | Plonéour FC (10) |
| 77. | La Plozévetienne (8) | 0–4 | AS Plobannalec-Lesconil (7) |
| 78. | FC Pleuvennois (11) | 7–1 | Marcassins Sportif Tréogat (12) |
| 79. | US Kergloff (12) | 0–6 | EA Scaër (10) |
| 80. | AS Melgven (9) | 1–1 (4–5 p) | Glaziks de Coray (10) |
| 81. | ES Langolen (12) | 0–4 | FC Quimperlois (7) |
| 82. | US Lennon (13) | 1–3 | Paotred Briec (11) |
| 83. | Hermine Concarnoise (11) | 1–3 | Paotred Dispount (6) |
| 84. | US Clohars-Carnoët (9) | 6–4 (a.e.t.) | PB Spézet (10) |
| 85. | ES Névez (12) | 0–3 | US Trégunc (7) |
| 86. | ES Beuzec (12) | 1–5 | Quimper Italia FC (9) |
| 87. | US Pays Rochois (12) | 0–8 | FC Trébeurden-Pleumeur-Bodou (10) |
| 88. | RC Ploumagoar (10) | 2–1 | FC Plouagat-Châtelaudren-Lanrodec (10) |
| 89. | AS Trédrez-Locquémeau (12) | 0–3 | US Ploubezre (10) |
| 90. | ES Ploubazlanec (10) | 1–3 | Ploufragan FC (7) |
| 91. | JS Lanvollon (9) | 3–1 | US Perros-Louannec (9) |
| 92. | Entente du Trieux FC (11) | 0–3 | US Plouisy (10) |
| 93. | AS Grâces (8) | 2–1 | Stade Paimpolais FC (7) |
| 94. | CS Bégard (8) | 2–5 | Lannion FC (5) |
| 95. | Rostrenen FC (9) | 3–0 | AS Trémuson (9) |
| 96. | FC Poulancre-Múr-St Gilles (11) | 1–4 | CO Briochin Sportif Ploufraganais (8) |
| 97. | ASL St Julien (10) | 2–1 | St Brandan-Quintin FC (11) |
| 98. | ES Le Fœil (12) | 0–1 | AS Ginglin Cesson (8) |
| 99. | US Callac (11) | 1–2 | Plérin FC (9) |
| 100. | Loudéac OSC (9) | 1–0 | US Langueux (7) |
| 101. | AS Trélivan (9) | 1–2 | CS Plédran (8) |
| 102. | US Brusvily (11) | 2–4 (a.e.t.) | US Frémur-Fresnaye (8) |
| 103. | CS Croix Lambert (11) | 1–6 | La Plancoëtine (8) |
| 104. | Plaintel SF (8) | 0–1 | Lamballe FC (7) |
| 105. | La Plœucoise Foot (12) | 1–0 | US Plessala (10) |
| 106. | Étoile Sud Armor Porhoët (11) | 3–0 | US Quessoy (9) |

== Fourth round ==
These matches were played on 24 and 25 September 2016.

Fourth round results: Bretagne

| Tie no | Home team (tier) | Score | Away team (tier) |
|---|---|---|---|
| 1. | Séné FC (8) | 0–6 | GSI Pontivy (6) |
| 2. | US La Gacilly (8) | 0–5 | AS Vitré (4) |
| 3. | Cormorans Sportif de Penmarc'h (9) | 0–3 | Lannion FC (5) |
| 4. | Fougères AGLD (5) | 0–1 | Stade Briochin (5) |
| 5. | Jeunesse Combourgesse (8) | 2–3 (a.e.t.) | Dinan-Léhon FC (5) |
| 6. | Dernières Cartouches Carhaix (10) | 0–2 | Châteaulin FC (8) |
| 7. | FC Pleuvennois (11) | 1–4 | US Trégunc (7) |
| 8. | Gas du Menez-Hom (11) | 0–3 | Plouzané AC (6) |
| 9. | Glaziks de Coray (10) | 1–1 (1–4 p) | Stella Maris Douarnenez (8) |
| 10. | Quimper Italia FC (9) | 0–2 | Landerneau FC (8) |
| 11. | ASPTT Brest (10) | 6–0 | ES St Thégonnec (9) |
| 12. | Étoile St Laurent (9) | 0–4 | Stade Plabennécois (4) |
| 13. | US Clohars-Carnoët (9) | 3–2 (a.e.t.) | US Goëlands de Larmor-Plage (7) |
| 14. | AS Plouvien (10) | 1–1 (5–4 p) | Étoile St Yves Ploudaniel (8) |
| 15. | JS St Thonanaise (12) | 0–1 | US Fouesnant (8) |
| 16. | Plonéour FC (10) | 3–1 | ES Lampaulaise (11) |
| 17. | FC Lanhouarneau-Plounévez-Lochrist (10) | 2–3 | EA Scaër (10) |
| 18. | Guipavas GdR (7) | 2–1 | SC Morlaix (8) |
| 19. | SC Lannilis (10) | 2–1 | AS Plobannalec-Lesconil (7) |
| 20. | Paotred Briec (11) | 0–11 | FC Quimperlois (7) |
| 21. | EA St Renan (8) | 1–5 | US Montagnarde (6) |
| 22. | CEP Lorient (8) | 2–3 | Paotred Dispount (6) |
| 23. | AS Plougoumelen-Bono (11) | 0–2 | FC Guichen (6) |
| 24. | US St Méen-St Onen (9) | 3–1 | Auray FC (6) |
| 25. | AS Chantepie (8) | 0–5 | Vannes OC (5) |
| 26. | Fleur d'Ajonc Inzinzac (11) | 0–2 | AS Cruguel (9) |
| 27. | Ruffiac-Malestroit (10) | 1–3 | Saint-Colomban Sportive Locminé (6) |
| 28. | La Patriote Malansac (11) | 1–3 | Indépendante Mauronnaise (10) |
| 29. | AS Moustoir-Ac (11) | 0–1 | CO Pacéen (9) |
| 30. | ES St Avé (9) | 0–1 (a.e.t.) | RC Rannée-La Guerche-Drouges (7) |
| 31. | AS Monterblanc (11) | 1–2 | La Vitréenne FC (7) |
| 32. | Stade Pontivyen (7) | 5–4 (a.e.t.) | Keriolets de Pluvigner (8) |
| 33. | AS Lanester (10) | 2–2 (5–4 p) | FC Klegereg (10) |
| 34. | Espérance de Rennes (9) | 3–2 | US Acigné (10) |
| 35. | Ajoncs d'Or St Nolff (12) | 1–5 | TA Rennes (5) |
| 36. | US Janzé (10) | 3–1 | US Arradon (10) |
| 37. | CS Bignan (9) | 1–2 | SC Le Rheu (8) |
| 38. | CS Josselin (12) | 5–1 | Garde St Eloi Kerfourn (11) |
| 39. | FC Guipry-Messac (8) | 3–1 | Baud FC (7) |
| 40. | Cercle Paul Bert Bréquigny (6) | 2–4 (a.e.t.) | US Saint-Malo (4) |
| 41. | Stade Louvignéen (9) | 1–3 | OC Cesson (6) |
| 42. | Étoile Sud Armor Porhoët (11) | 1–2 | Stade Pleudihennais (9) |
| 43. | La Plœucoise Foot (12) | 0–1 | ES Thorigné-Fouillard (10) |
| 44. | US Ploubezre (10) | 0–2 | FC La Chapelle-Montgermont (7) |
| 45. | Stade St Aubinais (10) | 0–0 (5–6 p) | FC Breteil-Talensac (9) |
| 46. | RC Ploumagoar (10) | 0–2 | CS Plédran (8) |
| 47. | US Plouisy (10) | 0–2 | FC Trébeurden-Pleumeur-Bodou (10) |
| 48. | FC Meillac-Lanhélin-Bonnemain (11) | 1–6 | Ploufragan FC (7) |
| 49. | AS Miniac-Morvan (11) | 0–4 | La Plancoëtine (8) |
| 50. | US Liffré (9) | 3–1 | AS Ginglin Cesson (8) |
| 51. | Plérin FC (9) | 1–0 | CO Briochin Sportif Ploufraganais (8) |
| 52. | Cercle Jules Ferry (10) | 2–5 | Lamballe FC (7) |
| 53. | US Frémur-Fresnaye (8) | 2–3 (a.e.t.) | Loudéac OSC (9) |
| 54. | JS Lanvollon (9) | 2–3 | ASL St Julien (10) |
| 55. | Rostrenen FC (9) | 0–1 | AS Grâces (8) |

== Fifth round ==
These matches were played on 8 and 9 October 2016.

Fifth round results: Bretagne

| Tie no | Home team (tier) | Score | Away team (tier) |
|---|---|---|---|
| 1. | US Janzé (10) | 0–6 | Vannes OC (5) |
| 2. | ASL St Julien (10) | 0–6 | Stade Briochin (5) |
| 3. | AS Cruguel (9) | 0–2 | AS Vitré (4) |
| 4. | RC Rannée-La Guerche-Drouges (7) | 3–2 | Dinan-Léhon FC (5) |
| 5. | La Vitréenne FC (7) | 0–2 | US Saint-Malo (4) |
| 6. | EA Scaër (10) | 0–2 | US Montagnarde (6) |
| 7. | FC Trébeurden-Pleumeur-Bodou (10) | 1–1 (3–4 p) | US Fouesnant (8) |
| 8. | US Clohars-Carnoët (9) | 0–3 | Guipavas GdR (7) |
| 9. | Plérin FC (9) | 2–3 | FC Quimperlois (7) |
| 10. | Paotred Dispount (6) | 2–0 | Stade Plabennécois (4) |
| 11. | Plonéour FC (10) | 0–7 | US Concarneau (3) |
| 12. | AS Lanester (10) | 0–6 | Lannion FC (5) |
| 13. | US Trégunc (7) | 3–1 | Landerneau FC (8) |
| 14. | Ploufragan FC (7) | 1–0 | Châteaulin FC (8) |
| 15. | CS Plédran (8) | 1–1 (6–7 p) | Plouzané AC (6) |
| 16. | SC Lannilis (10) | 1–2 | ASPTT Brest (10) |
| 17. | AS Plouvien (10) | 2–1 | AS Grâces (8) |
| 18. | Stella Maris Douarnenez (8) | 1–1 (2–3 p) | Saint-Colomban Sportive Locminé (6) |
| 19. | CO Pacéen (9) | 1–2 | ES Thorigné-Fouillard (10) |
| 20. | La Plancoëtine (8) | 6–0 | Espérance de Rennes (9) |
| 21. | FC Guipry-Messac (8) | 1–2 | TA Rennes (5) |
| 22. | Stade Pleudihennais (9) | 0–1 | Lamballe FC (7) |
| 23. | US St Méen-St Onen (9) | 0–2 | FC Guichen (6) |
| 24. | SC Le Rheu (8) | 6–1 | Loudéac OSC (9) |
| 25. | OC Cesson (6) | 0–1 | Stade Pontivyen (7) |
| 26. | Indépendante Mauronnaise (10) | 0–1 | FC Breteil-Talensac (9) |
| 27. | US Liffré (9) | 4–0 | FC La Chapelle-Montgermont (7) |
| 28. | CS Josselin (12) | 0–9 | GSI Pontivy (6) |
