= Dinan (disambiguation) =

Dinan may refer to:

== People ==
- Dinan Yahdian Javier (born 1995), Indonesian footballer
- David de Dinan or David of Dinant (1160–1217), pantheistic philosopher
- Daniel J. Dinan (born 1929), Special Trial Judge of the United States Tax Court
- Desmond Dinan, (born 1957), Irish academic and Jean Monnet Professor at the George Mason School of Public Policy, in Arlington, Virginia
- Nicola Dinan (born 1994), British-Malaysian writer
- Josce de Dinan (died 1166), Anglo-Norman nobleman

== Places ==
- Dinan, walled Breton town and commune in the Côtes-d'Armor department, northwestern France
- Dinan, Isfahan, village in Isfahan Province, Iran
- Dinan, Mazandaran, village in Mazandaran Province, Iran
- Arrondissement of Dinan, Côtes-d'Armor département, in the Brittany région
- Thoiré-sur-Dinan, commune in the Sarthe department in the region of Pays-de-la-Loire, north-western France

== Other uses ==
- Dinan Cars, American automotive parts company
- Dinan-Léhon FC, French football club in the Bretagne region
- Khorram-Dinan or Khurramites, Iranian religious and political movement with its roots in the movement founded by Mazdak
- River Dinan (Deen, Dinin), Ireland

== See also ==
- Denain
- Dinant
- Dineen
- Dioman
- Donnan (disambiguation)
- Dynan
