= Donnan (surname) =

Donnan is a surname. Notable people with the name include:

- Christopher B. Donnan, archaeologist
- Elizabeth Donnan (1883–1955), American historian of the slave trade
- Frederick G. Donnan (1870–1956), British chemist
- Geoffrey Donnan, Australian neurologist
- Harry Donnan (1864–1956), Australian cricketer
- Jeanie Donnan (1864–1942), Scottish poet
- Jim Donnan (born 1945), American football player and coach
- Pauline Donnan (1885–1934), American soprano opera singer
- William G. Donnan (1834–1908), Iowa politician

== See also ==
- Donan
- Donen
