= Double layer =

Double layer may refer to:

- Double layer (biospecific), the surface where two different phases of matter are in contact
- Double layer (plasma physics), a structure in a plasma and consists of two parallel layers with opposite electrical charge
- Double layer (surface science), a structure that appears on the surface of an object when it is placed into a liquid
- Double layer forces, which occur between charged objects across liquids
- Double layer potential, a solution of Laplace's equation
- Double layer suturing, two layers of sutures, first in a deep level of a tissue and then at a more superficial level
- DVD+R DL/DVD-R DL or Double layer, a DVD format
