= Donnan =

Donnan can refer to:

- Donnan (surname)
- Donnan, Iowa, a community in the United States
- Donnán of Eigg, Gaelic priest of the 7th century
- Donnan equilibrium
  - Donnan potential
