= Donen =

Donen is a surname. Notable people with the surname include:

- Joshua Donen (born 1955), American film producer, son of Stanley
- Stanley Donen (1924–2019), American film director and choreographer

== See also ==
- Donan
- Donnan (surname)
- Donnan (disambiguation)
