= List of fellows of the Royal Society elected in 1911 =

This is a complete list of fellows of the Royal Society elected in 1911.

== Fellows ==
- Evelyn Baring
- Howard Turner Barnes
- Adrian John Brown
- Julius Berend Cohen
- Walter Ernest Dixon
- Frederick George Donnan
- Edmond Herbert Grove-Hills
- William Henry Lang
- John Beresford Leathes
- Edward Alfred Minchin
- Robert Muir
- Richard Dixon Oldham
- Reginald Innes Pocock
- Alfred William Porter
- Herbert William Richmond
- Lionel Walter Rothschild
- George Gerald Stoney

== Foreign members ==
- Jons Oskar Backlund
- Joseph Achille Le Bel
- Paul Heinrich Ritter von Groth
- Heinrich Johannes Gustav Kayser
- Clement Arkadevich Timiriazeff

== See also ==
- List of Fellows of the Royal Society
