= Yanis Ammour =

French football player (born 1999)

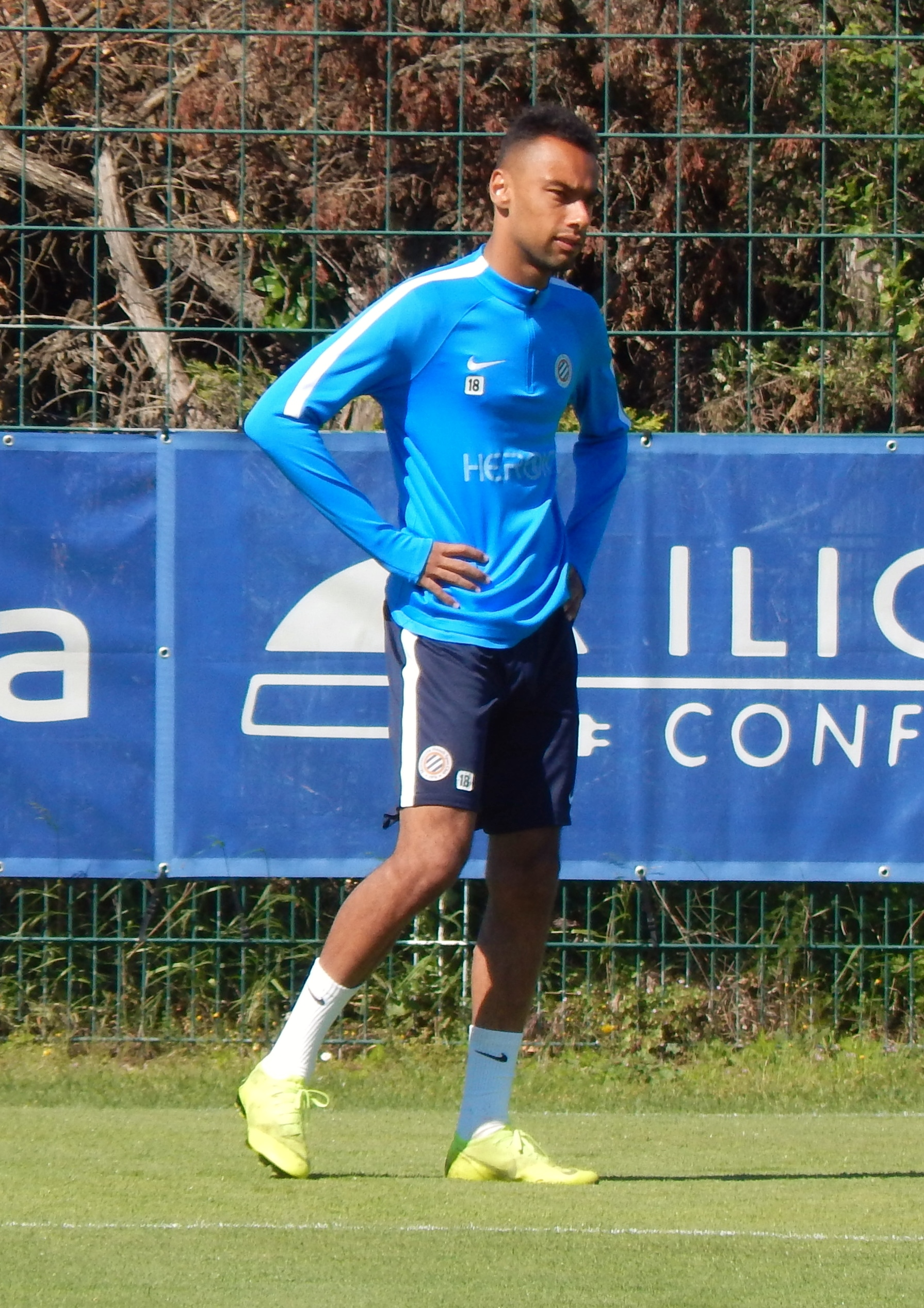
- Ammour in 2019

Personal information
- Date of birth: 21 May 1999 (age 27)
- Place of birth: Montpellier, France
- Height: 1.82 m (6 ft 0 in)
- Position: Forward

Team information
- Current team: Dinan Léhon
- Number: 18

Youth career
- 2005–2018: Montpellier

Senior career*
Years	Team	Apps	(Gls)
2017–2021	Montpellier II	45	(11)
2018–2021	Montpellier	1	(0)
2019–2020	→ Béziers (loan)	13	(0)
2019–2020	→ Béziers II (loan)	7	(1)
2021–2022	AEK Athens B	9	(1)
2022	→ Kavala (loan)	13	(0)
2022–2023	Sète 34	20	(5)
2023–2024	Stade Beaucairois	16	(5)
2024–2025	Thonon Evian	23	(4)
2025–	Dinan Léhon	7	(1)

International career
2014	France U16	2	(0)
2016	France U17	1	(0)
- * Club domestic league appearances and goals as of 4 December 2025

Yanis Ammour (born 21 May 1999) is a French professional footballer who plays as a forward for Championnat National 1 club Dinan Léhon.

== Club career ==
On 4 April 2018, Ammour signed his first professional contract with his childhood club Montpellier HSC. He made his professional debut in a 2–0 Ligue 1 win over Girondins de Bordeaux on 21 October 2018.

On 31 August 2021, he signed with Super League Greece 2 club AEK Athens B.

== Personal life ==
Born in France, Ammour is of Tunisian descent.
