= Gibbs–Donnan effect =

Behaviour of charged particles near a semi-permeable membrane

Donnan equilibrium across a cell membrane (schematic)

The Gibbs–Donnan effect (also known as the Donnan's effect, Donnan law, Donnan equilibrium, or Gibbs–Donnan equilibrium) is a name for the behaviour of charged particles near a semi-permeable membrane that sometimes fail to distribute evenly across the two sides of the membrane. The usual cause is the presence of a different charged substance that is unable to pass through the membrane and thus creates an uneven electrical charge. For example, the large anionic proteins in blood plasma are not permeable to capillary walls. Because small cations are attracted, but are not bound to the proteins, small anions will cross capillary walls away from the anionic proteins more readily than small cations.

Thus, some ionic species can pass through the barrier while others cannot. The solutions may be gels or colloids as well as solutions of electrolytes, and as such the phase boundary between gels, or a gel and a liquid, can also act as a selective barrier. The electric potential arising between two such solutions is called the Donnan potential.

The effect is named after the American Josiah Willard Gibbs who proposed it in 1878 and the British chemist Frederick G. Donnan who studied it experimentally in 1911.

The Donnan equilibrium is prominent in the triphasic model for articular cartilage proposed by Mow and Lai, as well as in electrochemical fuel cells and dialysis.

The Donnan effect is tactic pressure attributable to cations (Na^{+} and K^{+}) attached to dissolved plasma proteins.

== Example ==
The presence of a charged impermeant ion (for example, a protein) on one side of a membrane will result in an asymmetric distribution of permeant charged ions. The Gibbs–Donnan equation at equilibrium states (assuming permeant ions are Na^{+} and Cl^{−}):
$$[\text{Na}^+]_\alpha [\text{Cl}^-]_\alpha = [\text{Na}^+]_\beta [\text{Cl}^-]_\beta$$
Equivalently,
$$\frac{[\text{Na}^+]_\alpha}{[\text{Na}^+]_\beta} = \frac{[\text{Cl}^-]_\beta}{[\text{Cl}^-]_\alpha}$$

Start	Equilibrium	Osmolarity
$\alpha$: 9 Na, 9 Cl $\beta$: 9 Na, 9 Protein	$\alpha$: 6 Na, 6 Cl $\beta$: 12 Na, 3 Cl, 9 Protein	$\alpha$: 12 $\beta$: 24

=== Double Donnan ===
Note that Sides 1 and 2 are no longer in osmotic equilibrium (i.e. the total osmolytes on each side are not the same)

In vivo, ion balance does equilibriate at the proportions that would be predicted by the Gibbs–Donnan model, because the cell cannot tolerate the attendant large influx of water. This is balanced by instating a functionally impermeant cation, Na^{+}, extracellularly to counter the anionic protein. Na^{+} does cross the membrane via leak channels (the permeability is approximately 1/10 that of K^{+}, the most permeant ion) but, as per the pump-leak model, it is extruded by the Na^{+}/K^{+}-ATPase.

=== pH change ===
Because there is a difference in concentration of ions on either side of the membrane, the pH (defined using the relative activity) may also differ when protons are involved. In many instances, from ultrafiltration of proteins to ion exchange chromatography, the pH of the buffer adjacent to the charged groups of the membrane is different from the pH of the rest of the buffer solution. When the charged groups are negative (basic), then they will attract protons so that the pH will be lower than the surrounding buffer. When the charged groups are positive (acidic), then they will repel protons so that the pH will be higher than the surrounding buffer.

=== Physiological applications ===
==== Red blood cells ====
When tissue cells are in a protein-containing fluid, the Donnan effect of the cytoplasmic proteins is equal and opposite to the Donnan effect of the extracellular proteins. The opposing Donnan effects cause chloride ions to migrate inside the cell, increasing the intracellular chloride concentration. The Donnan effect may explain why some red blood cells do not have active sodium pumps; the effect relieves the osmotic pressure of plasma proteins, which is why sodium pumping is less important for maintaining the cell volume.

==== Neurology ====
Brain tissue swelling, known as cerebral oedema, results from brain injury and other traumatic head injuries that can increase intracranial pressure (ICP). Negatively charged molecules within cells create a fixed charge density, which increases intracranial pressure through the Donnan effect. ATP pumps maintain a negative membrane potential even though negative charges leak across the membrane; this action establishes a chemical and electrical gradient.

The negative charge in the cell and ions outside the cell creates a thermodynamic potential; if damage occurs to the brain and cells lose their membrane integrity, ions will rush into the cell to balance chemical and electrical gradients that were previously established. The membrane voltage will become zero, but the chemical gradient will still exist. To neutralize the negative charges within the cell, cations flow in, which increases the osmotic pressure inside relative to the outside of the cell. The increased osmotic pressure forces water to flow into the cell and tissue swelling occurs.

== See also ==
- Chemical equilibrium
- Nernst equation
- Double layer (biology)
- Osmotic pressure
- Diffusion equilibrium
