= Amir Arli =

Footballer (born 2003)

Personal information
- Full name: Amir Emin Arli
- Date of birth: 5 January 2003 (age 23)
- Place of birth: Oyonnax, France
- Height: 1.78 m (5 ft 10 in)
- Position: Midfielder

Team information
- Current team: Dinan Léhon
- Number: 19

Youth career
- 2009–2016: PVFC Oyonnax
- 2016–2018: Jura Sud Foot
- 2018–2020: Dijon

Senior career*
Years	Team	Apps	(Gls)
2020–2022	Dijon II	17	(0)
2021–2022	Dijon	1	(0)
2022–2023	Samsunspor	0	(0)
2022	→ Kastamonuspor 1966 (loan)	1	(0)
2023–2025	Jura Sud	52	(6)
2025–2026	Dinan Léhon	3	(0)
2026–	PVFC Oyonnax		

International career
2019	Turkey U16	2	(0)
- * Club domestic league appearances and goals as of 23 November 2024

Amir Emin Arli (Turkish: Arlı; born 5 January 2003) is a professional footballer who plays as a midfielder for Régional 1 club PVFC Oyonnax. Born in France, he has been called up by both Turkey and France at youth international level.

== Club career ==
A youth product of Plastics Vallée and Jura Sud Foot, Arli joined the youth academy of Dijon in 2018. After working his way up their youth categories, Arli signed his first professional contract with the club on 17 May 2021. He made his professional debut with Dijon in a 3–0 Ligue 2 win over Nancy on 21 December 2021.

On 20 June 2022, Arli signed a three-year contract with Samsunspor in Turkey.

== International career ==
Born in France, Arli is of Turkish descent. In 2018, he was called up to the France U16s, before playing for the Turkey U16s for a pair of friendlies in February 2019. In September 2020, he was called up to the France U18s.
