= Dynan =

Dynan is a surname. Notable people with the surname include:

- Karen Dynan (fl. 1985), American economist
- Phil Dynan (born 1948), American artist and author

== See also ==
- Dinan (disambiguation)
- Dynon, surname
