= Ulrick Eneme Ella =

Gabonese footballer (born 2001)

Personal information
- Full name: Ulrick Brad Eneme Ella
- Date of birth: 22 May 2001 (age 25)
- Place of birth: Sens, France
- Height: 1.84 m (6 ft 0 in)
- Position: Forward

Team information
- Current team: Dinan Léhon
- Number: 9

Youth career
- 2008–2015: Sens
- 2015–2017: Auxerre
- 2017–2019: Red Bull Salzburg
- 2019: → Liefering (loan)

Senior career*
Years	Team	Apps	(Gls)
2019–2020	Amiens II	13	(4)
2020–2022	Brighton & Hove Albion	0	(0)
2022–2025	Angers	0	(0)
2022–2025	Angers II	22	(6)
2024–2025	→ Paris 13 Atletico (loan)	4	(0)
2025–	Dinan Léhon	7	(0)

International career^{‡}
2017	France U16	8	(3)
2017–2018	France U17	11	(1)
2018–2019	France U18	15	(2)
2019	France U19	8	(3)
2023–	Gabon U23	3	(0)
2021–	Gabon	4	(0)
- * Club domestic league appearances and goals as of 4 December 2025 ‡ National team caps and goals as of 15:57, 12 January 2024 (UTC)

Ulrick Brad Eneme Ella (born 22 May 2001) is a professional footballer who plays as forward for Championnat National 1 club Dinan Léhon. Born in France, he plays for the Gabon national team.

== Club career ==
Eneme Ella began playing football at the youth academies of Sens and Auxerre in France, before moving to Austria with Red Bull Salzburg in 2017. He had a stint on loan with Liefering before moving to Amiens in the summer of 2019. He began his senior career with Amiens' reserves, before transferring to England to join the academy of Brighton & Hove Albion on 22 September 2020.

In June 2022, Eneme Ella signed a three-year contract with Angers. On 21 November 2024, he was loaned by Paris 13 Atletico in Championnat National. On 24 June 2025, it was announced that he had signed for Dinan Léhon.

== International career ==
Born in France, Eneme Ella is of Gabonese descent. He is a former youth international for France, having represented the France U16s, U17, U18, and U19. However, he decided to represent Gabon and debuted with them in a 2–1 2022 FIFA World Cup qualification loss to Egypt on 16 November 2021.
