= Jeanie Donnan =

Scottish poet

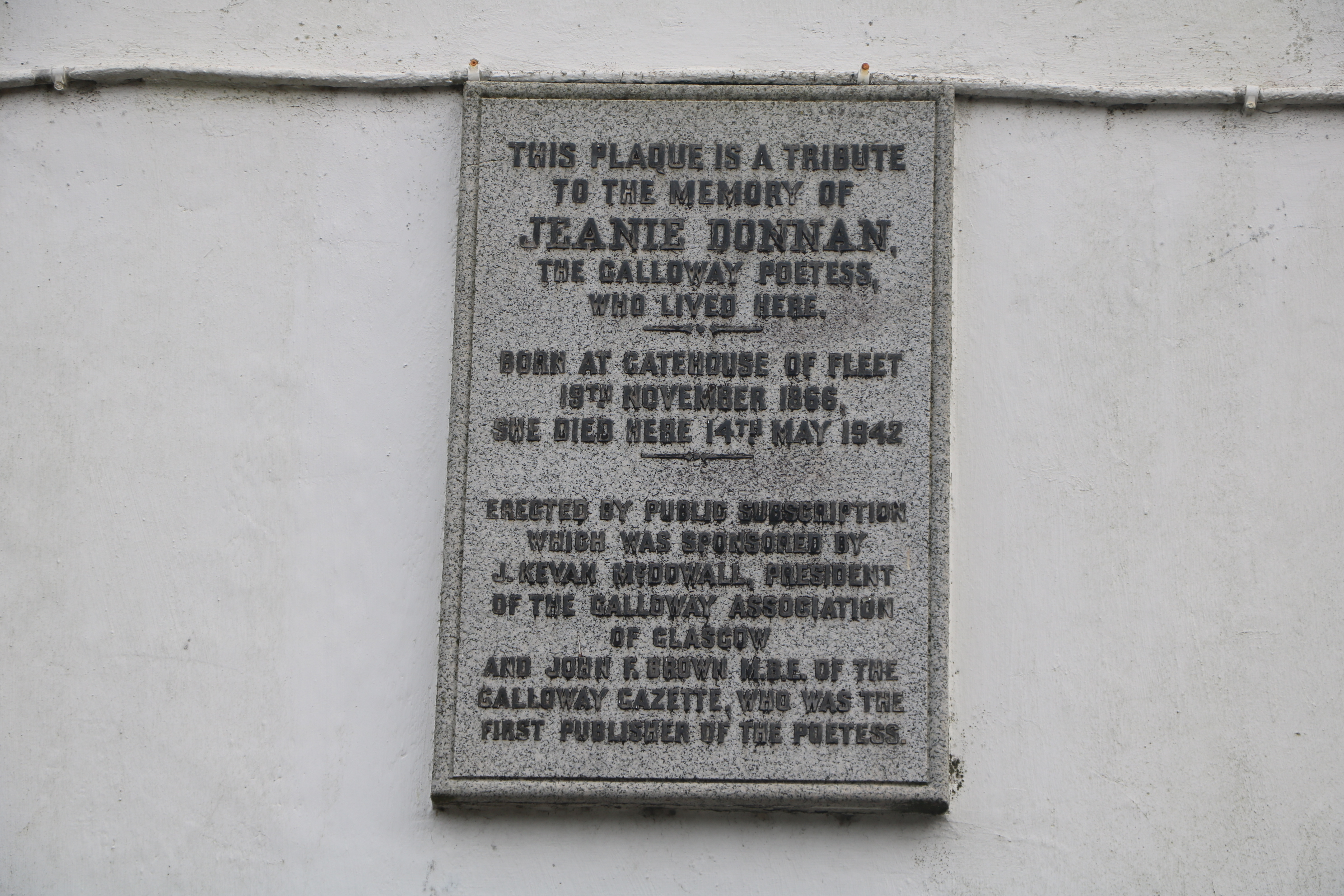
Plaque in Whithorn, Scotland commemorating the poet Jeanie Donnan.

Jeanie Donnan (née Munro; 19 November 1864 – 14 May 1942) was a Scottish poet known as the Galloway Poetess. She was born in Gatehouse of Fleet and moved to Whithorn after her marriage to James Donnan.

She was encouraged to write poetry by the minister of the Priory Church, Rev Donald Henry. For forty years she contributed poems to the Poet's Corner of The Galloway Gazette. John F Brown, the newspaper's editor, enlisted Dr Michael Macmillan of the University of Birmingham to collect and edit a collection of her poetry, which was published under the title Hameland in 1907. She published three further collections of poetry, including War Poems (1915), the proceeds of which were given to charities associated with the war effort. Her poem A Plea is included in the 1916 anthology One Hundred of the Best Poems on the European War by Women Poets of the Empire.

A memorial plaque on her house (76 George St) in Whithorn was unveiled by Lady M'Culloch of Ardwall (Gatehouse of Fleet) on 2 October 1948.

== Works ==
- Hameland (1907)
- Heatherbloom: Poems and Songs (1911)
- Warm Poems (1915, enlarged ed. 1919)
- The Hills o' Hame (1930)
