= Donnan potential =

Potential resulting from the Donnan equilibrium

Donnan potential is the difference in the Galvani potentials which appears as a result of Donnan equilibrium, named after Frederick G. Donnan, which refers to the distribution of ion species between two ionic solutions separated by a semipermeable membrane or boundary. The boundary layer maintains an unequal distribution of ionic solute concentration by acting as a selective barrier to ionic diffusion. Some species of ions may pass through the barrier while others may not. The solutions may be gels or colloids as well as ionic liquids, and as such the phase boundary between gels or a gel and a liquid can also act as a selective barrier. The Electric potential that arises between such two solutions is called Donnan potential.

Donnan equilibrium is prominent in the triphasic model for articular cartilage proposed by Mow and Ratcliffe, as well as in electrochemical fuel cells and dialysis.

The Donnan effect is extra osmotic pressure attributable to cations (Na^{+} and K^{+}) attached to dissolved plasma proteins.

== See also ==
- Chemical equilibrium
- Nernst equation
- Double Layer (biospecific)
