= Frederick G. Donnan =

Ceylonese chemist (1870–1956)

Professor Frederick G. Donnan CBE FRS FRSE
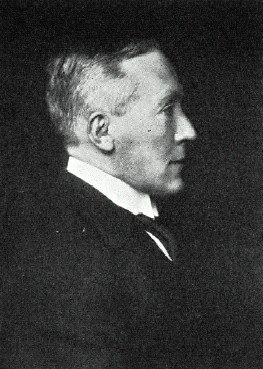
- Donnan in 1927
- Born: Frederick George Donnan; 6 September 1870; Colombo, British Ceylon
- Died: 16 December 1956 (aged 86); Canterbury, England
- Education: Queen's College, Belfast (BA); Leipzig University (PhD)
- Known for: Donnan potential Gibbs–Donnan effect
- Awards: FRS (1911); Order of the British Empire (1920); Longstaff Prize (1924); Davy Medal (1928); FRSE (1936)
- Scientific career
- Fields: Chemistry
- Workplaces: University College London; University of Liverpool
- Doctoral advisor: Wilhelm Ostwald
- Other academic advisors: J. H. van't Hoff
- Doctoral students: Shanti Swaroop Bhatnagar; Jaroslav Heyrovský

Signature
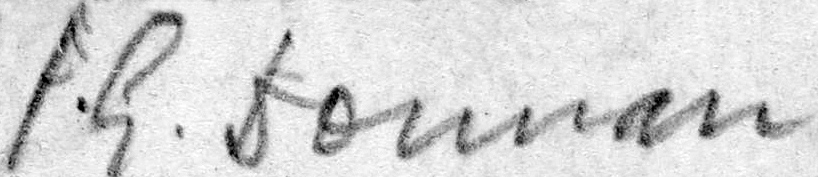

Frederick George Donnan (6 September 1870 – 16 December 1956) was a Ceylonese-born British chemist who is known for the Gibbs–Donnan effect describing ionic transport in cells. He spent most of his career at University College London.

== Life ==
Donnan was born in Colombo, Ceylon, the son of William Donnan, a Belfast merchant, and his wife, Jane Ross Turnley Liggate. He spent his early life in Ulster. He was blind in one eye as the result of a childhood accident, and is often shown in profile. He studied at Queen's College, Belfast gaining a Bachelor of Arts degree in 1894, then at the University of Leipzig with Wilhelm Ostwald, resulting in a PhD in 1896, followed by research with J. H. van't Hoff. Donnan then became a research student at University College London, joining the academic staff in 1901.

In 1903, he became a lecturer on organic chemistry at the Royal College of Science, Dublin, followed a chair in physical chemistry at the University of Liverpool in 1906. In 1913, he returned to University College London, where he remained until his retirement, serving as Head of Department from 1928 to 1937.

He died in Canterbury on 16 December 1956. He was unmarried and had no children.

== Work ==
During the First World War, Donnan was a consultant to the Ministry of Munitions, and worked with chemical engineer K. B. Quinan on plants for the fixation of nitrogen, for compounds essential for the manufacture of munitions. It was for this work that Donnan received the CBE in 1920. It was also during this period that he coined the word aerosol. He was said to have been "an early enthusiast for the new discipline of chemical engineering", and following the war was closely involved with the company Brunner Mond in the development of a major chemical works at Billingham.

Donnan's 1911 paper on membrane equilibrium was important for leather and gelatin technology, but even more so for understanding the transport of materials between living cells and their surroundings. It was on this so-called Donnan equilibrium that he frequently was asked to lecture across Europe and America, and is largely the only scientific research for which he is remembered today. The Donnan equilibrium remains an important concept for understanding ion transport in cells.

Just before World War II, Donnan was active in helping European refugees wanting to flee from the Nazis. Among those he assisted were Hermann Arthur Jahn and Edward Teller, who wrote their paper on the Jahn–Teller effect while in London.

== Positions held ==
Founder member of the Faraday Society and its president from 1924–26.

Fellow of the Chemical Society and President 1937-39.

President of the British Association of Chemists 1940-41.

== Honours ==
- 1911 – Fellow of the Royal Society
- 1920 – CBE for wartime services
- 1924 – Longstaff Medal of the Chemical Society
- 1928 – Davy Medal
- 1936 – Fellow of the Royal Society of Edinburgh
- Donnan received 11 honorary degrees.

== Collections ==
In 1957 Donnan's family donated his archive to the library at University College London. The collection contains correspondence, subject files, copies of reports and speeches, and photographic material.
