= Double layer (biology) =

Electric double layers at interfaces in biological systems, such as biological cells and organelles, proteins, DNA and other biological macromolecules poses three distinctive peculiarities comparing to the traditional double layers.

== Heterogeneous electric surface charge ==
The biological interfaces in aqueous solutions carry many different types of chemical groups, each with a different dissociation constant. Electric surface charge generated on interface by dissociation of these groups is heterogeneous, which creates problems with its measurement. On other hand this creates an opportunity for separating biological macromolecules with high precision using gel electrophoresis following pioneering work by Tiselius.

This heterogeneity is not unique for biological systems. It exists also, for instance in clays, but at much lesser degree.

== Glycocalyx layer ==
Glycocalyx
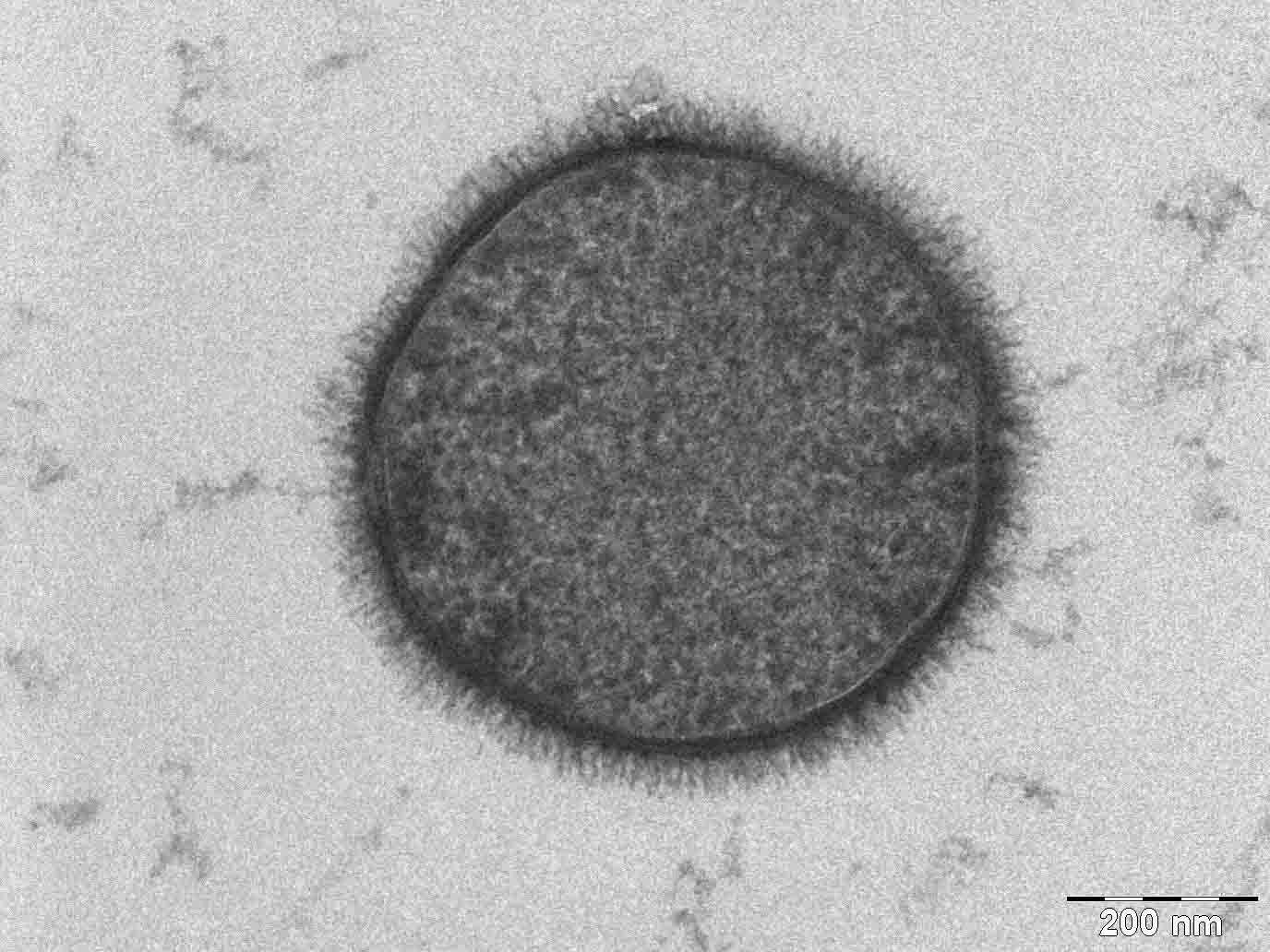
- TEM micrograph of a B. subtilis bacterium, with the hair-like glycocalyx visible surrounding the cell membrane (scale bar = 200 nm)

The glycocalyx is a layer of glycosylated biomolecules, such as glycoproteins and glycolipids, covering virtually all biological cells and organelles. These molecules are embedded in and extend outwards from the cell membranes. They form a layer of "hair-like" filaments on the external interfaces of biological objects as shown on the photo to the right. These filaments care electric charges due to dissociation of chemical groups that form them when the layer is saturated with water. There are also counter-ions that are located in the water phase and electrically screen filaments' charges as in typical double layer. Electric potential inside of such charged glycocalyx layer differs from the electric potential in the water bulk outside of the layer. It gradually changes from the inside value to the zero value far away in the bulk. The fraction of this potential drop that is located in the water phase determines electric potential of the external electric double layer of the biological object with glycocalyx layer. There is well developed theory describing this electric potential distribution .

This effect is not unique for biological objects. There is a concept of soft matter. It brings together biological objects and other ones, inorganic, but consisting of or containing filaments layers saturated with water. The most known example of such systems are polyelectrolytes. The polyelectrolyte volume charge creates an equilibrium electric potential known as the Donnan potential. Part of the Donnan potential is located inside of the polyelectrolyte layer, while the other part is associated with the external double layer located in the dispersion medium. Donnan potential plays important role in the mentioned above theory of the charged glycocalyx layer.

== Ion pumps cause additional charge separation in EDL of living cells ==
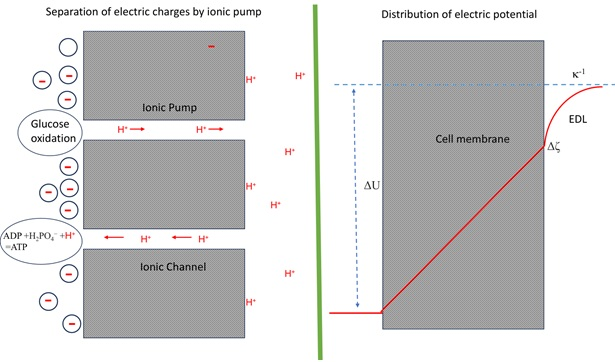

Ion pumps are integral membrane proteins that are capable of transporting ions (H^{+}, Na^{+}, K^{+}) through the cell membrane against gradient of electrochemical potential. Chemiosmotic theory by Mitchell links such transport of H^{+} ions to the synthesis of universal cell energy source - adenosine triphosphate (ATP) from glucose. One ATP molecule is synthesized from one ADP (adenosine diphosphate) molecule plus one phosphate group H_{2}PO_{4}^{-} and one H^{+} ion. The oxidizing of glucose molecule leads to transfer of 38 H+ ions across the membrane into the outside liquid.This transfer of cations from to cell to outer water solutions creates difference in electric potential between cell interior and the water bulk. It is called resting transmembrane potential U. Figure on the right illustrates this process.

Transmembrane potential would be localized completely on the membrane only if all expelled H^{+} ions would remain attached to the external membrane interface with water. This would depend on the chemical composition on that interface. It is most likely that some of them would diffuse towards the water bulk, as shown on Figure on the right for four ions. However, they cannot leave the cell vicinity completely because of attraction to the negative charge that remains inside of the cell. This situation resembles classical electric double layer, where interior negative charges play role of the surface charge and expelled cations form diffuse layer. It means that there must be relationship between transmembrane potential and zeta potential, which characterizes electric potential drop in the electric double layer.

This relationship was discovered by Redmann in 1974. This discovery was confirmed later by several other groups.

Theoretically this relationship between transmembrane potential U and zeta potential ζ was described by Andrei Dukhin in the paper. Here is the equation that determines fraction of the transmembrane potential that is associated with EDL (ζ_{u})

$$\zeta_u = \frac{{\sigma_u}}{{C_m+C_{edl}}}  +\frac{{UC_m}}{{C_m+C_{edl}}}$$

where C_{m} is differential capacity of the membrane, C_{edl} is differential capacity of the double layer, σ_{u} is a fraction of the surface charge that is composed by the expelled ions that remain adsorbed at the interface.
