= FC Guichen =

Football club based in Guichen, France

Guichen
- Full name: Football Club de Guichen
- Short name: FCG
- Founded: 1959
- Stadium: Stade Charles Gautier
- Capacity: 2,000
- League: Régional 1 Bretagne, Group B
- 2019–20: National 3 Group K, 14th (relegated)
- Website: www.fcg.bzh

Football Club de Guichen is a football club based in Guichen, France. As of the 2021–22 season, it competes in the Régional 1, the sixth tier of the French football league system. The team plays its home games at the Stade Charles Gautier. Red and white are the club colours.

== History ==
FC Guichen was founded in 1959. In 2017, the club was promoted to the Championnat National 3 for the first time.In 2018, a relegation to the Régional 1 was followed by promotion to the National 3 in 2019. In the 2019–20 season, Guichen was again relegated from the National 3.

In the 2020–21 Coupe de France, Guichen reached the round of 64, where they lost 1–0 to Saumur.
