= US Montagnarde =

French football club

- Full name: Union Sportive Montagnarde Inzinzac-Lochrist
- Founded: 1937; 88 years ago
- Ground: Stade Mané Braz, Inzinzac-Lochrist
- Capacity: 3,500
- President: Kevin Le Gal
- Manager: Nicolas Cloarec
- League: Régional 1 Brittany
- 2022–23: National 3 Group K, 14th (relegated)
- Website: https://usmontagnarde.fr

Union Sportive Montagnarde is a French football club founded in 1937. They are based in the town of Inzinzac-Lochrist and their home stadium is the Stade Mané Braz, which has a capacity of 3,500 spectators. For the 2023–24 season they play in Régional 1, the sixth tier of French football. After winning promotion to the fifth tier in 2022, they were relegated back to the regional level again in 2023.

The club notably reached the Round of 16 of the Coupe de France in both 1999 as a tier five side, and 2002 as a tier six side.
