= Dinan Léhon FC =

Football club in Dinan and Léhon, France

- Full name: Dinan Léhon Football Club
- Founded: 2003; 23 years ago
- Ground: Stade du Clos Gastel, Dinan
- Capacity: 2,000
- Chairman: Serge Lefort, Manuel Seror
- Manager: Stéphane Lamant
- League: National 1 Group B
- 2023–24: National 2 Group C, 5th of 14
Home colours	Away colours

Dinan Léhon Football Club is a French football club based in the communes of Dinan and Léhon in the Bretagne region. The club currently plays in the Championnat National 1 from 2023–24, the fourth division of French football, after achieving promotion from the Championnat National 3 in the 2022–23 season.

== History ==
The club was founded in 2003, through the merger of ASC Léhon and Stade Dinanais. It won promotion to the national level divisions for the first time in 2010.

The club finished the 2022–23 Championnat National 3 season top of the Brittany group, and secured promotion to Championnat National 1 for the first time in their history.

== Current squad ==
As of 10 November 2025

Note: Flags indicate national team as defined under FIFA eligibility rules; some limited exceptions apply. Players may hold more than one non-FIFA nationality.

No.	Pos.	Nation	Player
1	GK	GLP	Nicolas Pistol
3	DF	FRA	Hugo Julien
4	DF	FRA	Kevin Coiffic
6	MF	FRA	Lino Dufouil
7	MF	FRA	Saïdou Sam
8	DF	FRA	Victor Lefebvre
9	FW	GAB	Ulrick Eneme Ella
10	DF	FRA	Hugo Jacquemin
11	MF	FRA	Anthony Vermet
15	DF	FRA	James Le Marer
16	GK	FRA	Corentin Guyon
18	FW	FRA	Yanis Ammour

No.	Pos.	Nation	Player
19	MF	TUR	Amir Arli
20	DF	FRA	Thomas Biziki
21	FW	EGY	Mahmoud El Wakil
22	FW	FRA	Ely Julien
24	MF	FRA	Max Denis (on loan from Lecce Primavera)
25	DF	FRA	Christopher Mendy
26	MF	FRA	Damani Touré
27	DF	FRA	Alexandre Huot
28	DF	MTN	Abdoulkader Thiam
29	FW	GAB	Noah Bongo
30	GK	FRA	Téo Hamelin

== Crest ==
Second Logo uses from 2014 until 2021

== Honours ==
- Championnat National 3
  - Winner (1): 2022–23
