= 2022–23 Coupe de France preliminary rounds, Brittany =

The 2022–23 Coupe de France preliminary rounds, Brittany is the qualifying competition to decide which teams from the leagues of the Brittany region of France take part in the main competition from the seventh round.

A total of fourteen teams will qualify from the Brittany preliminary rounds.

In 2021–22, AS Vitré and Vannes OC both progressed to the round of 32. Vannes were beaten by Paris Saint-Germain, whilst Vitré lost to eventual winner FC Nantes.

== Draws and fixtures ==
On 18 June 2022, the league announced that 688 teams had entered the competition from the region. The draw for the first round was published on 25 August 2022, featuring 554 teams.

The second round draw was published on 30 August 2022, with 123 teams entering at this stage. A total of 200 ties were drawn, but only 199 were scheduled due to penalties from the first round.

The third round draw was published on 5 September 2022, with 12 teams from Championnat National 3 entering at this stage. The fourth round draw, which saw the entry of the two teams from Championnat National 2, was published on 14 September 2022.

The fifth round draw, featuring the two teams in the region from Championnat National, was published on 29 September 2022. The sixth round draw was published on 10 October 2022.

=== First round ===
These matches were played on 27 and 28 August 2022.

First round results: Brittany
Tie no	Home team (tier)	Score	Away team (tier)
1.	Racing Cast-Porzay (10)	0–2	Edern Sports (9)
2.	Coquelicots du Trévoux (11)	0–2	FC Aven-Bélon (9)
3.	US Saint-Thurien (12)	0–3 (Note: Tie won by means of forfeit.)	AS Kernével (10)
4.	Locunolé Sports (10)	0-3	ES Rédené (9)
5.	AS Tréméven (10)	0–2	Stade Mellacois (9)
6.	US Clohars-Carnoët (9)	1–0	ES Névez (8)
7.	US Querrien (10)	0–4	US Quimperloise (9)
8.	AS Melgven (10)	0–3	FC Rosporden (9)
9.	AS Saint-Yvi (10)	1–4	Mélénicks Elliant (9)
10.	US Fouesnant (9)	5–1	La Raquette Tréméoc (10)
11.	Combrit Sainte-Marine FC (10)	0–12	CA Forestois (9)
12.	AS Loctudy (10)	5–4	FC Pleuvennois (9)
13.	Gars de Plomeur (10)	1–2	Espoir Clohars Fouesnant (9)
14.	ÉS Saint-Jean-Trolimon (11)	1–5	FC Treffiagat-Guilvinec (10)
15.	FC Odet (9)	0–2	Cormorans Sportif de Penmarc'h (8)
16.	Marcassins Sportif Tréogat (10)	0–4	Plonéour FC (8)
17.	JS Plogastel (10)	2–0	FC Bigouden (10)
18.	US Pluguffan (9)	1–1 (3–1 p)	AS Plomelin (8)
19.	Quimper Ergué-Armel FC (8)	1–1 (5–4 p)	US Saint-Évarzec (9)
20.	US Portugais Quimper (10)	0–8	FC Quimper Penhars (9)
21.	AS Plouhinec (10)	0–9	FC Penn-ar-Bed (9)
22.	FC Goyen (10)	4–3	Goulien Sports (9)
23.	Stade Pontécrucien (11)	0–3	ES Beuzec (9)
24.	ES Mahalon-Confort (9)	0–3	La Plozévetienne (8)
25.	Pouldergat Sport (10)	0–5	Gas d'Ys Tréboul (8)
26.	ES Landudec-Guiler (10)	0–2	Gourlizon Sport (9)
27.	ÉS Plonéis (11)	0–8	AS Diables du Juch (10)
28.	Lapins de Guengat (10)	2–5	ÉS Plogonnec (8)
29.	Ar'Goliath FC (12)	0–3	US Crozon-Morgat (10)
30.	FC Pen Hir Camaret (10)	1–3	Lanvéoc Sports (9)
31.	Gas du Menez-Hom (10)	0–0 (4–3 p)	AS Telgruc-sur-Mer (10)
32.	AS Tourc'h (11)	1–4	ES Langolen (9)
33.	Zèbres De Trégourez (11)	0–3	AS Gâs de Leuhan (9)
34.	US Kergloff (11)	2–1	AC Carhaix (10)
35.	AS Motreff (11)	0–6	Toros Plounévézel (10)
36.	FC Collorec (11)	2–1	US Landeleau (10)
37.	US Châteauneuf-du-Faou (9)	5–2	US Saint Hernin (10)
38.	Écureuils de Roudouallec (11)	1–3	PB Spézet (9)
39.	SS Saint-Goazec (11)	1–4	US Cléden-Poher (10)
40.	US Lennon (10)	2–2 (3–1 p)	Gars de Plonévez-du-Faou (9)
41.	Saint-Thois Sports (10)	2–2 (5–6 p)	Paotred Briec (9)
42.	ES Gouézec (11)	0–3	Tricolores Landrévarzec (10)
43.	US Quéménéven (10)	5–1	Stade Pleybennois (10)
44.	ES Douron (10)	0–2	AS Saint-Martin-des-Champs (8)
45.	Stade Léonard Kreisker (9)	1–1 (3–4 p)	Guiclan Plouénan FC (8)
46.	AS Pont-de-Buis (10)	0–3	FA de la Rade (9)
47.	US Cléder (9)	2–2 (2–3 p)	Saint-Pierre Plouescat (8)
48.	ES Tréflez (10)	0–3	Haut-Léon FC (8)
49.	US Pencran (10)	1–1 (5–3 p)	ES Cranou (8)
50.	US Rochoise (10)	1–0	AS Dirinon (8)
51.	JG Forestoise (10)	1–7	AS Kersaint (8)
52.	FC Le Drennec (10)	3–2	Étoile Saint-Yves Ploudaniel (8)
53.	Hermine Kernilis (10)	0–1	CND Le Folgoët (8)
54.	SC Lanrivoaré (10)	1–1 (4–3 p)	AS Guilers (8)
55.	US Plouigneau (9)	4–0 (Note: Tie reversed from original draw.)	La Guerlesquinaise (11)
56.	FC Gars du Roc'h (11)	0–1	ES Berrien-Huelgoat (10)
57.	Saint-Pierre Ploudiry-La Martyre (11)	1–1 (4–5 p)	ES Mignonne (9)
58.	US Saint-Servais-Saint-Derrien (11)	0–3	FC Plounéventer Plouédern (9)
59.	AS Saint-Vougay (11)	0–3	FC Côte des Légendes (10)
60.	AS Coat-Méal (11)	1–0	AJA Brélès Lanildut (10)
61.	Association Cavale Blanche Brest (11)	1–4	ASC Mahoraise Brest (9)
62.	AS Queliverzan (11)	0–2	ES Locmaria-Plouzané (9)
63.	US Garlan (12)	0–3	FC des Enclos (9)
64.	Avenir Plourin (10)	2–4	Étoile Trégoroise Plougasnou (9)
65.	US Taulé (10)	2–3	Paotred Rosko (9)
66.	US Lanmeur-Plouégat-Guérand (10)	2–3	FC Plouezoc'h (9)
67.	US Mespaul (10)	1–3	AS Santec (9)
68.	FC Sainte-Sève (10)	1–3	ÉF Plougourvest (9)
69.	ES Pleyber-Christ (10)	0–2	AS Sizun-Le Tréhou (9)
70.	PL Bergot (9)	6–2	RC Loperhet (10)
71.	ÉS Guissenyenne (10)	2–3	FC Lanhouarneau-Plounévez-Lochrist (9)
72.	VF Saint-Frégant (10)	4–2	Stade Landernéen Kergrèis (9)
73.	Légion Saint-Pierre (10)	0–4	Saint-Divy Sports (9)
74.	PL Pilier Rouge (10)	0–2	JS Saint-Thonanaise (9)
75.	Gars Saint-Majan (10)	2–1	US Plougonvelin (9)
76.	AS Ploumoguer (10)	0–12	FC Lampaulais (9)
77.	Étoile Saint-Arzel (10)	0–1	Arzelliz Ploudalmézeau (9)
78.	Avel Vor Saint-Pabu (10)	2–2 (3–5 p)	AS Landeda (9)
79.	US Aber-Benoît Tréglonou (10)	0–8	SC Lannilis (9)
80.	Méné Bré Sports Pédernec (9)	7–0	UO Trégor (9)
81.	AS Pabu Plein Air (10)	1–0	ES Pommerit Le Merzer (9)
82.	ES Frout Saint-Agathon (10)	3–6	Goëlo FC (8)
83.	Union Squiffiec-Trégonneau (9)	0–4	US Plouisy (9)
84.	ES Plougrasienne (11)	0–4	JS Lanvollon (8)
85.	Pléhédel Sport (12)	2–0	US Prat (11)
86.	FC Gommenec'h (11)	0–5	US Pluzunet-Tonquédec (10)
87.	US Méné Bré Louargat (10)	3–4	JS Coadout (11)
88.	FC La Chapelle-Neuve (11)	2–3	ES Guer (10)
89.	FC Lié (9)	0–0 (3–2 p)	Plounévez-Lanrivain-Trémargat US (9)
90.	AS Kérien-Magoar (10)	0–3	AS Uzel-Merléac (8)
91.	JS Cavan (8)	3–1	AS Grâces (8)
92.	FC Kreiz Breizh (9)	3–3 (4–3 p)	AS Trévé Sports (9)
93.	JS Allineuc (9)	1–0	ASAC Hémonstoir (10)
94.	ES Pestivien (10)	1–0	AS Plussulien (10)
95.	US Callac (9)	2–0	US Argoat-Pélem (10)
96.	FC Poulancre-Múr-Saint-Gilles (10)	1–0	AS Saint-Barnabé (11)
97.	US Maël-Carhaix (10)	0–3	FC Saint-Bugan (8)
98.	US Saint-Caradec (10)	1–0	AS Motterieux (9)
99.	RC Plusquellec (11)	2–6	FC La Croix-Corlay (9)
100.	Atlético Plerneuf (12)	0–3	AS Plélo (9)
101.	AS Tagarine (11)	5–1	ES Le Fœil (9)
102.	FC Plouagat-Châtelaudren-Lanrodec (9)	1–1 (4–5 p)	AS Pyramide Lanfains (10)
103.	AS Saint-Herve (10)	2–2 (1–4 p)	FC Le Vieux Bourg (11)
104.	FC Lantic (10)	2–0	ALSL Plémy (10)
105.	La Plœucoise Foot (9)	3–3 (6–7 p)	US Saint-Carreuc-Hénon (9)
106.	AS Plenaltais Plaine-Haute (10)	0–4	Pordic-Binic FC (8)
107.	US Briacine (9)	4–0	FC L'Hermitage Lorge (10)
108.	Étoile du Leff Boqueho (9)	3–2	AS Trémuson (9)
109.	Trieux FC (11)	0–3	ASL Saint-Julien (9)
110.	US Trémorel (10)	0–3	FC Côte de Penthièvre (9)
111.	Saint-Brieuc Football Ouest (10)	1–2	FC Moncontour-Trédaniel (9)
112.	Les Vallées FC (9)	6–0	CS Croix Lambert (10)
113.	Mené FC (11)	1–5	Dahus du Mont Bel-Air (8)
114.	UF Yffiniac (10)	0–3	AS Hillion-Saint-René (8)
115.	CS Merdrignac (8)	3–0	Gouessant Foot Coëtmieux-Andel-Morieux-Pommeret (9)
116.	US Hunaudaye (9)	0–0 (2–3 p)	CS Lanrelas (9)
117.	JS Landéhen (10)	3–1	ES Hénansal-Saint-Denoual-La Bouillie Emeraude (10)
118.	CS Illifaut (10)	2–5	ES Noyal (10)
119.	FC Centre Bretagne (8)	2–0	Étoile Sud Armor Porhoët (9)
120.	AL Trélat-Taden (11)	0–4	AS Bobital-Brusvily (10)
121.	RC Dinan (11)	8–0	US Plouasne-Saint-Juvat (9)
122.	FC Bourseul (11)	1–1 (4–3 p)	Rance FC (10)
123.	AS Guitté Guenroc (11)	0–4	US Yvignac-la-Tour (9)
124.	US Frémur-Fresnaye (8)	1–0	US Lanvallay (8)
125.	ES Saint-Cast-le-Guildo (9)	0–6	FC Plélan Vildé Corseul (8)
126.	FC Beaussais-Rance-Frémur (9)	0–1	Rance Coëtquen Football (10)
127.	Stade Évrannais (9)	0–2	AS Broons-Trémeur (9)
128.	AS Saint-Pôtan (10)	1–3	ASC La Landec (11)
129.	FC Quévertois (10)	0–3	US Erquy (8)
130.	AS Ploumilliau (9)	0–2	AS Servel-Lannion (9)
131.	ES Rudonou (10)	0–3	FC Trébeurden-Pleumeur-Bodou (8)
132.	FC Lizildry (11)	0–14	Stade Kénanais (10)
133.	US Kérity (10)	1–1 (3–4 p)	Goëlands de Plouézec FC (11)
134.	US Trieux-Lézardrieux-Pleudaniel (9)	6–3	CS Trégastel (11)
135.	JA Penvénan (9)	1–0	US Pays Rochois et Langoatais (9)
136.	SC Trédarzec (11)	4–1	AS Trédrez-Locquémeau (9)
137.	ES Ploulec'h (12)	0–10	AS Plestinaise (9)
138.	CS Rospez (9)	1–3	US Ploubezre (9)
139.	AS Pleubian-Pleumeur (9)	1–2	US Perros-Louannec (8)
140.	Avenir du Goëlo (9)	2–2 (4–2 p) (Note: Both teams penalised and removed from the competition.)	Trégor FC (9)
141.	AS Romillé (10)	1–2	US Bédée-Pleumeleuc (9)
142.	Espérance La Bouëxière (9)	3–0	US Sens-de-Bretagne (10)
143.	US Guignen (9)	1–2	US Noyal-Chatillon (9)
144.	US Pont-Péan (10)	5–0	US Chapelloise (10)
145.	US Bourgbarré (9)	1–3	US Bain (9)
146.	US Médréac (9)	1–8	SEP Quédillac (8)
147.	JA Pléchâtel (10)	1–2	AC Rennes (8)
148.	FC Plélan-Maxent (10)	0–2	ASC Saint-Erblon (10)
149.	JA Bréal (9)	2–0	Breizh Fobal Klub (9)
150.	US Orgères (10)	0–3	FC La Mézière-Melesse (9)
151.	AS Chantepie (9)	1–1 (1–2 p)	US Gosné (8)
152.	FC des Landes (10)	3–1	US Acigné (9)
153.	AS Vezin-le-Coquet (10)	1–5	FC Tinténiac-Saint-Domineuc (8)
154.	Stade Louvignéen (8)	3–1	JS Nouvoitou (10)
155.	Hermine de Renac (10)	0–1	US Tertre Gris (9)
156.	AS Saint-Malo-de-Phily (10)	0–4	US Saint-Armel (9)
157.	AS Saint-Pierraise Épiniac (9)	2–2 (0–3 p)	AS Pays Malouin (8)
158.	US Cuguen (11)	0–3	ASE Lécousse (9)
159.	US Val d'Izé (9)	3–1	Cercle Paul Bert Gayeulles (9)
160.	ÉS Saint-Aubin-des-Landes/EF Cornillé (10)	0–1	ES Thorigné-Fouillard (9)
161.	USC Chavagne (9)	0–3	Avenir Lieuron (8)
162.	Cercle Paul Bert Villejean-Beauregard (11)	1–5	FC Mordelles (8)
163.	Le Reveil Seglinois (11)	1–1 (4–5 p)	AC Redonnais (10)
164.	AS Saint-Jacques (10)	2–3	Réveil de Lohéac (9)
165.	US Erbrée-Mondevert (10)	0–7	Ossé Saint-Aubin (10)
166.	Espérance Bréal-sous-Vitré (11)	0–3	Stade Castelbourgeois FC (8)
167.	Olympic Montreuil-Landavran (9)	0–2	FC Aubinois (8)
168.	AS Étrelles (9)	2–0	Bleuets Le Pertre-Brielles-Gennes-Saint-Cyr (8)
169.	AS Montreuil-le-Gast (10)	0–4	Espérance de Rennes (9)
170.	US Illet Forêt (8)	3–0	Domloup Sport (10)
171.	AS Saint-Germain-du-Pinel (12)	0–10	Rives Sportives du Couesnon (9)
172.	CS La Richardais (10)	4–0	US Saint-Guinoux (11)
173.	JS Picanaise (9)	0–2	Pleurtuit Côte d'Emeraude (8)
174.	US Le Crouais (10)	0–2	Avenir Irodouër (8)
175.	US Saint-Méen-Saint-Onen (9)	3–0	AS Parthenay-de-Bretagne (11)
176.	US Les Brulais-Comblessac (11)	0–3	Montfort-Iffendic (9)
177.	Entente Parigné/Landéan (10)	2–1	Fougères FC (9)
178.	ES Saint-Germain/Montours (9)	5–2	FC Baie du Mont Saint-Michel (9)
179.	US Domagné-Saint-Didier (10)	1–2	AS Retiers-Coësmes (8)
180.	AS Tremblay-Chauvigné (10)	1–1 (4–2 p)	AS Livré/Mecé (10)
181.	US Sainte-Marie (10)	1–2	FC Grand-Fougeray Sainte-Anne (9)
182.	Cercle Paul Bert Nord-Ouest (10)	2–1	Torcé-Vergéal FC (9)
183.	FC Stéphanais Briçois (9)	3–2	AS Ercé-près-Liffré (9)
184.	Triangle FC (12)	1–6	JA Pipriac (9)
185.	US Saint-Marc/Saint-Ouen (10)	1–2	FC La Chapelle-Montgermont (8)
186.	FC Pays d'Anast (10)	0–1	Espérance Sixt-sur-Aff (9)
187.	Entente Sens-Vieux-Vy Gahard (10)	1–5	Bocage FC (8)
188.	Association Châtillon-en-Vendelais/Princé (10)	0–5	FC Louvigné-La Bazouge (9)
189.	FC Canton du Sel (10)	2–0	Hermine La Noë Blanche (10)
190.	Combourg SC (11)	1–2	US Château-Malo (8)
191.	SC Luitré-Dompierre (11)	0–4	JA Balazé (8)
192.	AS Melting Villejean (12)	0–6	US Vern-sur-Seiche (9)
193.	FC Haute Bretagne Romantique (10)	0–13	US Gévezé (8)
194.	US La Baie La Fresnais (12)	0–5	JA Saint-Servan (9)
195.	La Seiche FC (9)	0–3	US Janzé (8)
196.	OC Brétillien (11)	1–2	CS Servon (8)
197.	Essé Le Theil FC (10)	1–3	Avenir Domalain (9)
198.	FC Plerguer Roz (11)	1–1 (1–4 p)	La Mélorienne (10)
199.	FC Baulon-Lassy (11)	2–2 (5–3 p)	US Gaël Muel (10)
200.	Haute Vilaine FC (10)	1–2	Stade Saint-Aubinais (8)
201.	US Bel Air (9)	0–0 (5–4 p)	Cadets Chelun Martigné-Ferchaud (8)
202.	US Langoëlan-Ploërdut (10)	5–0	ASC Kernascléden Lignol (11)
203.	ES Langonnet (11)	1–3	Avenir du Pays Pourleth (10)
204.	US Lanvénégen (11)	2–2 (5–4 p)	ES Ségliennaise (10)
205.	US Le Faouët (11)	1–10	Stade Guémenois (9)
206.	FC Meslan (9)	0–3	Avenir Guiscriff (9)
207.	FL Inguiniel (10)	5–0	AS Bubry (10)
208.	AS Priziac (10)	0–4	JA Arzano (9)
209.	US Berné (11)	0–1 (Note: Match abandoned just before half time due to US Berné having insufficient players to continue, FC Klegereg qualify.)	FC Klegereg (8)
210.	FC Kerzec (10)	1–1 (4–1 p)	Caudan SF (9)
211.	VFL Keryado Lorient (10)	0–5	AS Lanester (8)
212.	Saint-Efflam Kervignac (8)	2–4	FC Kerchopine (9)
213.	Lanester FC (9)	0–3	Stiren Cléguer FC (9)
214.	Stade Hennebontais (10)	2–0	Entente Saint-Gilloise (10)
215.	AS Guermeur (10)	2–6	CS Quéven (8)
216.	AS Gestel (9)	0–3	FOLC Lorient Ouest (9)
217.	US Groix (11)	0–3	AS Calanaise (9)
218.	AS Plouharnel (10)	2–5	Avenir Sainte-Hélène (10)
219.	AS Bélugas Belz (8)	3–0	FC Quiberon Saint-Pierre (9)
220.	Erdeven-Étel Foot (10)	0–6	Plouhinec FC (8)
221.	US Bieuzy-Lanvaux (10)	1–5	Stade Landévantais (9)
222.	ES Merlevenez (10)	2–3	ES Crac'h (9)
223.	AS Belle-Île-en-Mer (10)	1–5	ES Ploemel (8)
224.	Hermine Locoal-Mendon (9)	3–9	FC Locmariaquer-Saint-Philibert (9)
225.	ES Sud Outre Rade (9)	3–0	Stade Gavrais (10)
226.	FC Gueltas Saint-Gérand Saint-Gonnery (10)	1–2	Saint-Pierre Pleugriffet (10)
227.	SC Sournais (9)	2–3	Ajoncs d'Or Saint-Malguénac (9)
228.	ACS Bieuzy-les-Eaux (10)	0–5	Garde Saint-Cyr Moréac (8)
229.	CS Pluméliau (9)	3–0	US Rohannaise (10)
230.	Vigilante Radenac (11)	1–6	Avenir Buléon-Lantillac (9)
231.	Garde Saint-Eloi Kerfourn (10)	2–1	Garde du Gohazé Saint Thuriau (9)
232.	ES Remungol (10)	3–0	Gueltas FC (11)
233.	Melrand Sports (10)	0–1	Saint-Clair Réguiny (9)
234.	Garde du Loch (9)	4–3	Rah-Koëd Plaudren FC (9)
235.	Guénin Sport (8)	4–0	Paotred du Tarun (9)
236.	Plumelin Sports (10)	0–1	EFC Saint-Jean-Brévelay (8)
237.	AS Pluvignoise (10)	11–0	Garde Saint-Arnould Saint-Allouestre (11)
238.	AL Camors (9)	0–3	ES Colpo (10)
239.	AS Moustoir-Ac (9)	2–2 (4–5 p)	Baud FC (8)
240.	AS Kergonan (9)	2–1	AS Saint-Barthélemy (10)
241.	AS Saint-Jean-Brévelay (10)	0–7	Semeurs de Grand-Champ (9)
242.	ASC Baden (10)	0–1	Prat Poulfanc Sport (10)
243.	ASC Sainte-Anne-d'Auray (10)	0–3	Sarzeau FC (8)
244.	US Arradon (9)	2–1	AS Meucon (10)
245.	CS Pluneret (9)	6–0	Ajoncs d'Or Saint-Nolff (10)
246.	AS Turcs de l'Ouest (10)	0–9	US Brech (8)
247.	AS Monterblanc (9)	1–1 (6–7 p)	US Ploeren (9)
248.	Gazélec AC Morbihan (10)	1–1 (4–1 p)	ES Surzur (10)
249.	ES Saint-Avé (8)	2–1	Damgan-Ambon Sport (9)
250.	ES Mériadec (10)	2–7	AS Plougoumelen-Bono (9)
251.	CS Josselin (9)	2–3	Aurore de Taupont (9)
252.	AS Croix-Helléan (10)	0–1	Avenir Saint-Servant-sur-Oust (9)
253.	Saint-Hubert Sport Lanouée (10)	1–3	Avenir de Guilliers (10)
254.	Garde de Mi-Voie Guillac (10)	5–0	Hermine Ménéac FC (10)
255.	Bleuets Néant-sur-Yvel (10)	0–0 (3–4 p)	OC Beignon (10)
256.	Elan Montertelot (10)	1–1 (3–2 p)	Caro/Missiriac AS (10)
257.	Garde de l'Yvel Loyat (11)	1–9	Indépendante Mauronnaise (9)
258.	Saint-Jean de Villenard Sports (10)	1–5	Enfants de Saint-Gildas (8)
259.	US Le Cours (10)	1–2	Bogue D'Or Questembert (8)
260.	Gentienne Pluherlin (10)	2–0	Glaneurs de Lizio (11)
261.	La Mélécienne de Plumelec (10)	0–6	US Saint-Abraham Chapelle-Caro (9)
262.	JA Pleucadeuc (9)	5–0	AS Saint-Eloi La Vraie-Croix (10)
263.	Cercle Saint-Martin Trédion (10)	6–2	Chevaliers Saint-Maurice Saint-Guyomard (10)
264.	AS Cruguel (8)	1–0	Montagnards Sulniac (9)
265.	La Sérentaise (10)	1–4	AS La Claie (9)
266.	Ecureils Roc-Saint-André (10)	2–0	ES Larré-Molac (9)
267.	Cadets de Guéhenno (10)	7–0	AS Berric-Lauzach (9)
268.	Avenir Saint-Vincent-sur-Oust (10)	0–10	FC Basse Vilaine (8)
269.	FC Saint-Perreux (9)	0–3	US Saint-Melaine Rieux (8)
270.	Saint-Clair Limerzel (10)	5–1	Saint-Léon de Glénac (10)
271.	JA Peillac (10)	1–2	FC Cournon 56 (10)
272.	JF Noyal-Muzillac (9)	0–0 (5–3 p)	Fondelienne Carentoir (9)
273.	ES Quelneuc (10)	0–2	Saint-Sébastien Caden (10)
274.	Garde du Pont Marzan (9)	1–1 (4–2 p)	Espoir Saint-Jacut-les-Pins (9)
275.	AG Arzal (9)	7–1	Les Fougerêts-Saint-Martin-sur-Oust (10)
276.	CS Saint-Gaudence Allaire (9)	1–1 (4–5 p)	La Patriote Malansac (8)
277.	FC Bord de Rance (10)	0–3	US Saint-Jouan-des-Guérets (8)

=== Second round ===
These matches were played on 4 September 2022.

Second round results: Brittany
Tie no	Home team (tier)	Score	Away team (tier)
1.	US Rochoise (10)	2–0	AS Coat-Méal (11)
2.	AS Santec (9)	5–0	CND Le Folgoët (8)
3.	Espérance Plouguerneau (8)	1–4	EA Saint-Renan (7)
4.	Paotred Rosko (9)	5–0	Gars Saint-Majan (10)
5.	PL Bergot (9)	2–4 (Note: Match abandoned after a fight between supporters and players of PL Bergot. PL Bergot penaised, ES Carantec-Henvic qualify.)	ES Carantec-Henvic (8)
6.	VF Saint-Frégant (10)	0–6	Landerneau FC (6)
7.	AS Landeda (9)	2–0	SC Lanrivoaré (10)
8.	FC Lanhouarneau-Plounévez-Lochrist (9)	1–0	ASC Mahoraise Brest (9)
9.	Arzelliz Ploudalmézeau (9)	1–0	FC Lampaulais (9)
10.	FC Plounéventer Plouédern (9)	0–2	AS Kersaint (8)
11.	US Plouigneau (9)	1–2	Saint-Pierre Plouescat (8)
12.	Vie au Grand Air Bohars (7)	6–0	FC Côte des Légendes (10)
13.	SC Lannilis (9)	0–1	AG Plouvorn (6)
14.	ÉF Plougourvest (9)	5–1	FC Plouezoc'h (9)
15.	US Pencran (10)	0–1	FC Gouesnou (7)
16.	Étoile Trégoroise Plougasnou (9)	2–1	ES Locmaria-Plouzané (9)
17.	FC Le Drennec (10)	0–3	Plouzané AC (6)
18.	Haut-Léon FC (8)	0–0 (3–5 p)	ES Portsall Kersaint (7)
19.	AL Coataudon (8)	1–0	RC Lesnevien (7)
20.	AS Plouvien (7)	1–1 (1–4 p)	Gars de Saint-Yves (7)
21.	US Kergloff (11)	1–11	AS Brest (7)
22.	Gas du Menez-Hom (10)	0–3	Guiclan Plouénan FC (8)
23.	FC Collorec (11)	0–8	JS Saint-Thonanaise (9)
24.	FA de la Rade (9)	1–1 (3–5 p)	ES Scrignac Poullaouen (8)
25.	US Cléden-Poher (10)	0–2	ES Saint-Thégonnec (7)
26.	FC des Enclos (9)	0–5	Plougastel FC (6)
27.	ES Mignonne (9)	1–2	Lanvéoc Sports (9)
28.	US Quéménéven (10)	1–4	FC Le Relecq-Kerhuon (8)
29.	Paotred Briec (9)	0–3	ASPTT Brest (7)
30.	ES Berrien-Huelgoat (10)	1–2	US Lennon (10)
31.	Quimper Ergué-Armel FC (8)	0–3	Guipavas GdR (6)
32.	AS Gâs de Leuhan (9)	0–3	FC Quimper Penhars (9)
33.	PB Spézet (9)	3–3 (5–4 p)	ÉS Plogonnec (8)
34.	Tricolores Landrévarzec (10)	0–4	AS Saint-Martin-des-Champs (8)
35.	Quimper Kerfeunteun FC (6)	4–1	SC Morlaix (7)
36.	Edern Sports (9)	1–2	Saint-Divy Sports (9)
37.	Toros Plounévézel (10)	0–3	Dernières Cartouches Carhaix (7)
38.	Châteaulin FC (7)	1–1 (5–3 p)	Landi FC (8)
39.	US Crozon-Morgat (10)	1–6	Étoile Saint Laurent (7)
40.	US Châteauneuf-du-Faou (9)	0–3	JU Plougonven (7)
41.	AS Diables du Juch (10)	1–4	AS Sizun-Le Tréhou (9)
42.	La Plozévetienne (8)	2–2 (4–5 p)	EA Scaër (7)
43.	US Quimperloise (9)	0–3	US Fouesnant (9)
44.	CA Forestois (9)	4–2	US Pluguffan (9)
45.	Gourin FC (8)	4–2	US Clohars-Carnoët (9)
46.	Mélénicks Elliant (9)	0–0 (4–2 p)	ES Langolen (9)
47.	AS Plobannalec-Lesconil (7)	7–0 (Note: Tie reversed from original draw.)	ES Rédené (9)
48.	AS Loctudy (10)	1–2	FC Pont-l'Abbé (7)
49.	FC Treffiagat-Guilvinec (10)	0–5	Fleur de Genêt Bannalec (8)
50.	AS Kernével (10)	1–0	JS Plogastel (10)
51.	Gourlizon Sport (9)	0–1	Espoir Clohars Fouesnant (9)
52.	FC Aven-Bélon (9)	0–1	US Trégunc (6)
53.	Stade Mellacois (9)	1–0	Glaziks de Coray (8)
54.	FC Rosporden (9)	1–4	Amicale Ergué-Gabéric (7)
55.	PD Ergué-Gabéric (6)	5–0	US Moëlan (7)
56.	FC Goyen (10)	1–1 (4–2 p)	FC Quimperlois (7)
57.	Gas d'Ys Tréboul (8)	5–2	Amicale Italia Bretagne (7)
58.	Cormorans Sportif de Penmarc'h (8)	2–1	Hermine Concarnoise (8)
59.	FC Penn-ar-Bed (9)	1–3	Stella Maris Douarnenez (6)
60.	ES Beuzec (9)	0–0 (1–3 p)	Plonéour FC (8)
61.	AS Pays Malouin (8)	2–4	FC Dinardais (7)
62.	FC Louvigné-La Bazouge (9)	1–0	Entente Parigné/Landéan (10)
63.	La Mélorienne (10)	1–3	AS Jacques Cartier (8)
64.	JA Saint-Servan (9)	0–1	La Cancalaise (7)
65.	FC Aubinois (8)	1–1 (4–2 p)	AS Vignoc-Hédé-Guipel (6)
66.	Pleurtuit Côte d'Emeraude (8)	0–2	AS Miniac-Morvan (7)
67.	Espérance La Bouëxière (9)	3–3 (4–5 p)	US Grégorienne (7)
68.	AS Tremblay-Chauvigné (10)	0–3	Stade Saint-Aubinais (8)
69.	FC La Mézière-Melesse (9)	0–3	CS Servon (8)
70.	La Chapelle-Janson/Fleurigné/Laignelet-le-Louroux (8)	1–1 (5–4 p)	FC Stéphanais Briçois (9)
71.	FC La Chapelle-Montgermont (8)	1–0	SC Le Rheu (7)
72.	Noyal-Brécé FC (8)	0–1	FC Beauregard Rennes (8)
73.	ASE Lécousse (9)	3–1	FC des Landes (10)
74.	Rives Sportives du Couesnon (9)	0–2	US Billé-Javené (8)
75.	ES Saint-Germain/Montours (9)	0–1	ASC Romagné (7)
76.	CS La Richardais (10)	1–2	US Château-Malo (8)
77.	ES Thorigné-Fouillard (9)	0–0 (4–3 p)	Cercle Paul Bert Nord-Ouest (10)
78.	Jeunesse Combourgeoise (8)	0–9	US Saint-Jouan-des-Guérets (8)
79.	Eskouadenn de Brocéliande (8)	1–2	CO Pacéen (7)
80.	US Gosné (8)	1–1 (3–1 p)	US Liffré (6)
81.	US Saint-Gilles (8)	1–2	Cercle Paul Bert Bréquigny (6)
82.	US Gévezé (8)	2–2 (6–7 p)	US Illet Forêt (8)
83.	FC Tinténiac-Saint-Domineuc (8)	1–2	CS Betton (7)
84.	AC Redonnais (10)	2–3	Réveil de Lohéac (9)
85.	Avenir Lieuron (8)	1–6	FC Atlantique Vilaine (6)
86.	FC Grand-Fougeray Sainte-Anne (9)	2–5	FC Mordelles (8)
87.	US Saint-Armel (9)	0–3	FC Bruz (7)
88.	Montfort-Iffendic (9)	0–1	Espérance Chartres-de-Bretagne (6)
89.	Avenir Domalain (9)	3–2	Stade Louvignéen (8)
90.	FC Baulon-Lassy (11)	0–2	JA Pipriac (9)
91.	US Val d'Izé (9)	1–2	La Vitréenne FC (7)
92.	US Noyal-Chatillon (9)	1–4	AS Retiers-Coësmes (8)
93.	AC Rennes (8)	3–0	FC Guichen (6)
94.	US Vern-sur-Seiche (9)	0–3	JA Balazé (8)
95.	US Tertre Gris (9)	1–4	US Bédée-Pleumeleuc (9)
96.	AS Étrelles (9)	0–0 (5–4 p)	US Châteaugiron (7)
97.	US Pont-Péan (10)	1–3	US Saint-Méen-Saint-Onen (9)
98.	Espérance de Rennes (9)	0–1	JA Bréal (9)
99.	Stade Castelbourgeois FC (8)	0–3	FC Guipry Messac (6)
100.	US Bain (9)	1–2	FC Hermitage-Chapelle-Cintré (7)
101.	Espérance Sixt-sur-Aff (9)	3–0	FC Canton du Sel (10)
102.	SEP Quédillac (8)	0–0 (3–4 p)	OC Montauban (7)
103.	US Laillé (8)	0–5	Cadets de Bains (6)
104.	Ossé Saint-Aubin (10)	1–3	Jeunes d'Argentré(7)
105.	US Janzé (8)	0–0 (6–5 p)	RC Rannée-La Guerche-Drouges (7)
106.	Avenir Irodouër (8)	0–2	FC Breteil-Talensac (6)
107.	ASC Saint-Erblon (10)	1–3	US Bel Air (9)
108.	US Ploubezre (9)	2–1	Méné Bré Sports Pédernec (9)
109.	US Pluzunet-Tonquédec (10)	1–5	CS Bégard (6)
110.	Stade Kénanais (10)	1–1 (2–4 p)	JS Lanvollon (8)
111.	SC Trédarzec (11)	1–3	JS Cavan (8)
112.	Entente du Trieux FC (8)	2–2 (3–4 p)	JA Penvénan (9)
113.	AS Plestinaise (9)	5–1	US Trieux-Lézardrieux-Pleudaniel (9)
114.	Goëlo FC (8)	0–3	US Perros-Louannec (8)
115.	Goëlands de Plouézec FC (11)	2–1	Pléhédel Sport (12)
116.	Stade Paimpolais FC (7)	0–4	FC Trébeurden-Pleumeur-Bodou (8)
117.	AS Pyramide Lanfains (10)	0–3	Étoile du Leff Boqueho (9)
118.	US Plouisy (9)	1–1 (2–4 p)	US Briacine (9)
119.	JS Coadout (11)	0–1	US Saint-Caradec (10)
120.	FC Le Vieux Bourg (11)	1–8	Loudéac OSC (6)
121.	US Callac (9)	1–3	RC Ploumagoar (7)
122.	FC Saint-Bugan (8)	2–5	US Goudelin (8)
123.	ES Pestivien (10)	1–6	AS Uzel-Merléac (8)
124.	AS Pabu Plein Air (10)	4–0	FC Kreiz Breizh (9)
125.	FC La Croix-Corlay (9)	2–2 (3–1 p)	JS Allineuc (9)
126.	ES Guer (10)	0–1	Rostrenen FC (8)
127.	FC Poulancre-Múr-Saint-Gilles (10)	1–9	Saint-Brandan-Quintin FC (7)
128.	AS Hillion-Saint-René (8)	1–1 (7–6 p)	Plaintel SF (7)
129.	AS Trégueux (8)	0–2	AS Ginglin Cesson (6)
130.	ASL Saint-Julien (9)	0–2	CS Plédran (8)
131.	US Langueux (7)	1–0	Évron FC (8)
132.	JS Landéhen (10)	0–5	CO Briochin Sportif Ploufraganais (6)
133.	Dahus du Mont Bel-Air (8)	2–0	FC Lié (9)
134.	FC Centre Bretagne (8)	0–3	Ploufragan FC (7)
135.	AS Tagarine (11)	2–1	FC Lantic (10)
136.	AS Plélo (9)	1–2	Pordic-Binic FC (8)
137.	Plérin FC (7)	2–1	US Quessoy (6)
138.	FC Moncontour-Trédaniel (9)	0–1	US Saint-Carreuc-Hénon (9)
139.	CS Lanrelas (9)	0–0 (4–2 p)	US Yvignac-la-Tour (9)
140.	AS Broons-Trémeur (9)	4–3	CS Merdrignac (8)
141.	AS Trélivan (7)	8–0	US Frémur-Fresnaye (8)
142.	ES Noyal (10)	1–5	FC Plélan Vildé Corseul (8)
143.	AS Bobital-Brusvily (10)	1–7	Plancoët-Arguenon FC (6)
144.	ASC La Landec (11)	0–8	Lamballe FC (6)
145.	FC Côte de Penthièvre (9)	4–1	Rance Coëtquen Football (10)
146.	RC Dinan (11)	2–0	Val d'Arguenon Créhen-Pluduno (8)
147.	US Erquy (8)	1–2	Les Vallées FC (9)
148.	FC Bourseul (11)	0–2	Stade Pleudihennais (7)
149.	US La Gacilly (7)	1–4	Ploërmel FC (6)
150.	Indépendante Mauronnaise (9)	0–1	Avenir de Guilliers (10)
151.	US Saint-Abraham Chapelle-Caro (9)	5–1	EFC Saint-Jean-Brévelay (8)
152.	Ruffiac-Malestroit (8)	4–0	Avenir Saint-Servant-sur-Oust (9)
153.	Ecureils Roc-Saint-André (10)	2–4	AS Cruguel (8)
154.	Aurore de Taupont (9)	2–3	Enfants de Saint-Gildas (8)
155.	OC Beignon (10)	1–1 (4–2 p)	Garde de Mi-Voie Guillac (10)
156.	AS La Claie (9)	2–2 (2–4 p)	Elan Montertelot (10)
157.	Enfants de Guer (8)	0–0 (2–4 p)	CS Bignan (7)
158.	FC Cournon 56 (10)	1–2	FC Basse Vilaine (8)
159.	Saint-Clair Limerzel (10)	1–5	La Patriote Malansac (8)
160.	Cercle Saint-Martin Trédion (10)	0–0 (4–5 p)	Garde du Pont Marzan (9)
161.	Gentienne Pluherlin (10)	1–12	AS Ménimur (7)
162.	JF Noyal-Muzillac (9)	0–0 (1–3 p)	Armoricaine Péaule (8)
163.	AG Arzal (9)	0–3	Avenir Theix (7)
164.	US Saint-Melaine Rieux (8)	0–2	Muzillac OS (7)
165.	JA Pleucadeuc (9)	2–2 (6–5 p)	Elvinoise Foot (7)
166.	Saint-Sébastien Caden (10)	0–0 (3–4 p)	Bogue D'Or Questembert (8)
167.	ES Colpo (10)	2–4	CS Pluneret (9)
168.	Semeurs de Grand-Champ (9)	1–1 (3–4 p)	Keriolets de Pluvigner (6)
169.	Prat Poulfanc Sport (10)	1–6	Gazélec AC Morbihan (10)
170.	AS Pluvignoise (10)	1–5	US Arradon (9)
171.	Sarzeau FC (8)	2–4	Séné FC (7)
172.	US Ploeren (9)	1–2	Garde du Loch (9)
173.	AS Plougoumelen-Bono (9)	0–1	ES Plescop (7)
174.	US Brech (8)	0–0 (2–4 p)	ES Saint-Avé (8)
175.	Saint-Clair Réguiny (9)	2–1	Cadets de Guéhenno (10)
176.	Garde Saint-Cyr Moréac (8)	3–1	Avenir Buléon-Lantillac (9)
177.	CS Pluméliau (9)	2–2 (4–5 p)	Garde Saint-Eloi Kerfourn (10)
178.	Baud FC (8)	2–2 (3–2 p)	FC Naizin (7)
179.	FC Klegereg (8)	1–3	Guénin Sport (8)
180.	Saint-Pierre Pleugriffet (10)	0–6	Stade Pontivyen (6)
181.	ES Remungol (10)	0–5	Moutons Blanc de Noyal-Pontivy (7)
182.	Ajoncs d'Or Saint-Malguénac (9)	1–3	Espérance Bréhan (7)
183.	AS Lanester (8)	0–1	Riantec OC (7)
184.	Plouhinec FC (8)	10–0	FC Locmariaquer-Saint-Philibert (9)
185.	FOLC Lorient Ouest (9)	3–1	Stade Hennebontais (10)
186.	Avenir Sainte-Hélène (10)	0–5	ES Ploemel (8)
187.	Stade Landévantais (9)	1–4	Landaul Sports (7)
188.	Languidic FC (8)	4–0	AS Kergonan (9)
189.	ES Crac'h (9)	1–1 (5–4 p)	ES Sud Outre Rade (9)
190.	AS Bélugas Belz (8)	0–1	Auray FC (6)
191.	Avenir Guiscriff (9)	0–1	FC Kerzec (10)
192.	US Goëlands de Larmor-Plage (8)	7–0	FC Plouay (8)
193.	FC Kerchopine (9)	0–0 (7–6 p)	JA Arzano (9)
194.	La Guideloise (8)	0–5	CEP Lorient (6)
195.	US Lanvénégen (11)	0–5	CS Quéven (8)
196.	Avenir du Pays Pourleth (10)	0–4	Lorient Sports (7)
197.	AS Calanaise (9)	0–3	FC Ploemeur (7)
198.	Stiren Cléguer FC (9)	4–1	US Langoëlan-Ploërdut (10)
199.	Stade Guémenois (9)	2–3	FL Inguiniel (10)
200.	AS Servel-Lannion (9)	– (Note: Tie won by walkover due to the opposing team being excluded from the competition after the draw was made.)	walkover

=== Third round ===
These matches were played on 10 and 11 September 2022.

Third round results: Brittany
Tie no	Home team (tier)	Score	Away team (tier)
1.	Goëlands de Plouézec FC (11)	1–5	AS Pabu Plein Air (10)
2.	Saint-Brandan-Quintin FC (7)	2–2 (5–3 p)	CO Briochin Sportif Ploufraganais (6)
3.	AS Servel-Lannion (9)	1–3	FC Trébeurden-Pleumeur-Bodou (8)
4.	JS Lanvollon (8)	1–1 (4–3 p)	JA Penvénan (9)
5.	US Briacine (9)	1–3 (Note: Rostronen FC penalised, US Briacine qualify.)	Rostrenen FC (8)
6.	US Perros-Louannec (8)	2–0	Plérin FC (7)
7.	FC La Croix-Corlay (9)	0–5	Lannion FC (5)
8.	JS Cavan (8)	4–2	US Ploubezre (9)
9.	Étoile du Leff Boqueho (9)	1–6	AS Ginglin Cesson (6)
10.	RC Ploumagoar (7)	0–2	CS Bégard (6)
11.	US Goudelin (8)	1–1 (5–4 p)	AS Plestinaise (9)
12.	US Saint-Caradec (10)	1–1 (3–4 p)	AS Tagarine (11)
13.	Stade Pleudihennais (7)	0–1	Dinan-Léhon FC (5)
14.	RC Dinan (11)	6–1	CS Lanrelas (9)
15.	Pordic-Binic FC (8)	2–3	AS Trélivan (7)
16.	FC Côte de Penthièvre (9)	1–10	Lamballe FC (6)
17.	AS Hillion-Saint-René (8)	3–0	AS Broons-Trémeur (9)
18.	FC Plélan Vildé Corseul (8)	0–5	Loudéac OSC (6)
19.	AS Uzel-Merléac (8)	4–2	Dahus du Mont Bel-Air (8)
20.	CS Plédran (8)	0–3	US Langueux (7)
21.	Plancoët-Arguenon FC (6)	1–1 (4–5 p)	Ploufragan FC (7)
22.	US Saint-Carreuc-Hénon (9)	2–1	Les Vallées FC (9)
23.	CS Betton (7)	0–7	US Fougères (5)
24.	FC Aubinois (8)	0–1	Entente Samsonnaise Doloise (5)
25.	JA Bréal (9)	8–1	ASE Lécousse (9)
26.	FC Dinardais (7)	1–2	US Saint-Jouan-des-Guérets (8)
27.	Avenir Domalain (9)	0–1	FC Louvigné-La Bazouge (9)
28.	AS Jacques Cartier (8)	0–4	Bocage FC (8)
29.	ASC Romagné (7)	0–0 (4–5 p)	Espérance Chartres-de-Bretagne (6)
30.	US Illet Forêt (8)	2–2 (5–4 p)	Cercle Paul Bert Bréquigny (6)
31.	ES Thorigné-Fouillard (9)	1–5	US Grégorienne (7)
32.	Stade Saint-Aubinais (8)	0–1	FC Breteil-Talensac (6)
33.	La Cancalaise (7)	1–0	US Château-Malo (8)
34.	US Billé-Javené (8)	0–2	US Gosné (8)
35.	US Bédée-Pleumeleuc (9)	3–4	AS Miniac-Morvan (7)
36.	JA Pipriac (9)	0–7	FC Atlantique Vilaine (6)
37.	JA Balazé (8)	2–2 (2–4 p)	Espérance Sixt-sur-Aff (9)
38.	AS Retiers-Coësmes (8)	1–3	CO Pacéen (7)
39.	FC La Chapelle-Montgermont (8)	0–1	AS Étrelles (9)
40.	FC Bruz (7)	4–0	FC Mordelles (8)
41.	FC Beauregard Rennes (8)	4–0	CS Servon (8)
42.	La Vitréenne FC (7)	5–1	US Janzé (8)
43.	Cadets de Bains (6)	0–1	OC Cesson (5)
44.	AC Rennes (8)	2–6	AS Vitré (5)
45.	OC Montauban (7)	2–1	FC Guipry Messac (6)
46.	US Bel Air (9)	0–4	Jeunes d'Argentré (7)
47.	FC Hermitage-Chapelle-Cintré (7)	0–2	TA Rennes (5)
48.	US Saint-Méen-Saint-Onen (9)	3–3 (3–4 p)	Réveil de Lohéac (9)
49.	FC Goyen (10)	0–4	US Trégunc (6)
50.	EA Scaër (7)	2–1	Cormorans Sportif de Penmarc'h (8)
51.	Espoir Clohars Fouesnant (9)	1–0	Stade Mellacois (9)
52.	PD Ergué-Gabéric (6)	6–1	AS Plobannalec-Lesconil (7)
53.	ES Scrignac Poullaouen (8)	4–2	Lanvéoc Sports (9)
54.	FC Quimper Penhars (9)	3–0	US Lennon (10)
55.	Amicale Ergué-Gabéric (7)	1–0	Fleur de Genêt Bannalec (8)
56.	Mélénicks Elliant (9)	1–1 (5–4 p)	Plonéour FC (8)
57.	PB Spézet (9)	0–4	Châteaulin FC (7)
58.	Quimper Kerfeunteun FC (6)	0–0 (4–2 p)	Saint-Pierre de Milizac (5)
59.	US Fouesnant (9)	1–1 (5–4 p)	Gas d'Ys Tréboul (8)
60.	AS Kernével (10)	1–3	CA Forestois (9)
61.	Gourin FC (8)	1–3	Stella Maris Douarnenez (6)
62.	FC Pont-l'Abbé (7)	3–3 (2–3 p)	Dernières Cartouches Carhaix (7)
63.	ASPTT Brest (7)	0–0 (3–4 p)	Plougastel FC (6)
64.	AS Saint-Martin-des-Champs (8)	1–1 (4–5 p)	FC Lanhouarneau-Plounévez-Lochrist (9)
65.	AS Sizun-Le Tréhou (9)	2–2 (3–2 p)	Étoile Trégoroise Plougasnou (9)
66.	Guipavas GdR (6)	0–2	Plouzané AC (6)
67.	Saint-Pierre Plouescat (8)	3–2	ES Saint-Thégonnec (7)
68.	Étoile Saint Laurent (7)	0–3	AS Brest (7)
69.	AS Santec (9)	0–1	Stade Plabennécois (5)
70.	ÉF Plougourvest (9)	0–1	AS Landeda (9)
71.	Paotred Rosko (9)	1–1 (5–4 p)	Gars de Saint-Yves (7)
72.	EA Saint-Renan (7)	3–0	Vie au Grand Air Bohars (7)
73.	US Rochoise (10)	0–4	Arzelliz Ploudalmézeau (9)
74.	FC Le Relecq-Kerhuon (8)	1–7	AL Coataudon (8)
75.	ES Carantec-Henvic (8)	0–7	AG Plouvorn (6)
76.	Guiclan Plouénan FC (8)	1–0	JS Saint-Thonanaise (9)
77.	AS Kersaint (8)	1–3	Landerneau FC (6)
78.	Saint-Divy Sports (9)	1–1 (1–3 p)	ES Portsall Kersaint (7)
79.	JU Plougonven (7)	2–1	FC Gouesnou (7)
80.	Avenir de Guilliers (10)	3–3 (5–4 p)	ES Crac'h (9)
81.	Elan Montertelot (10)	1–6	ES Plescop (7)
82.	AS Ménimur (7)	1–1 (5–6 p)	Séné FC (7)
83.	ES Ploemel (8)	0–0 (1–3 p)	Ruffiac-Malestroit (8)
84.	FC Kerzec (10)	0–7	FC Ploemeur (7)
85.	Lorient Sports (7)	1–1 (2–4 p)	Espérance Bréhan (7)
86.	Riantec OC (7)	1–0	Enfants de Saint-Gildas (8)
87.	US Saint-Abraham Chapelle-Caro (9)	0–2	Auray FC (6)
88.	CEP Lorient (6)	7–0	CS Bignan (7)
89.	Guénin Sport (8)	5–1	Bogue D'Or Questembert (8)
90.	CS Pluneret (9)	1–1 (5–4 p)	Stiren Cléguer FC (9)
91.	Garde Saint-Eloi Kerfourn (10)	1–2	Avenir Theix (7)
92.	Saint-Clair Réguiny (9)	0–2	Stade Pontivyen (6)
93.	Armoricaine Péaule (8)	0–1	Baud FC (8)
94.	Keriolets de Pluvigner (6)	2–3	Muzillac OS (7)
95.	Plouhinec FC (8)	3–1	Languidic FC (8)
96.	FOLC Lorient Ouest (9)	2–2 (3–5 p)	FC Kerchopine (9)
97.	ES Saint-Avé (8)	5–0	AS Cruguel (8)
98.	US Arradon (9)	3–1	Landaul Sports (7)
99.	OC Beignon (10)	0–6	US Goëlands de Larmor-Plage (8)
100.	Gazélec AC Morbihan (10)	2–3	Garde du Pont Marzan (9)
101.	JA Pleucadeuc (9)	2–4	Moutons Blanc de Noyal-Pontivy (7)
102.	FL Inguiniel (10)	0–0 (1–3 p)	La Patriote Malansac (8)
103.	Garde du Loch (9)	1–6	Garde Saint-Cyr Moréac (8)
104.	GSI Pontivy (5)	2–0	US Montagnarde (5)
105.	CS Quéven (8)	0–2	Saint-Colomban Sportive Locminé (5)
106.	FC Basse Vilaine (8)	2–1	Ploërmel FC (6)

=== Fourth round ===
These matches were played on 24 and 25 September 2022.

Fourth round results: Brittany
Tie no	Home team (tier)	Score	Away team (tier)
1.	AS Étrelles (9)	0–1	La Vitréenne FC (7)
2.	FC Louvigné-La Bazouge (9)	1–4	La Cancalaise (7)
3.	FC Atlantique Vilaine (6)	1–1 (5–6 p)	OC Montauban (7)
4.	JA Bréal (9)	3–4	Muzillac OS (7)
5.	AS Miniac-Morvan (7)	7–1	La Patriote Malansac (8)
6.	Jeunes d'Argentré (7)	2–1	Bocage FC (8)
7.	Espérance Sixt-sur-Aff (9)	1–1 (9–10 p)	Entente Samsonnaise Doloise (5)
8.	US Fougères (5)	2–1	TA Rennes (5)
9.	US Illet Forêt (8)	0–4	Espérance Chartres-de-Bretagne (6)
10.	Avenir de Guilliers (10)	0–16	OC Cesson (5)
11.	FC Beauregard Rennes (8)	1–0	FC Breteil-Talensac (6)
12.	Garde du Pont Marzan (9)	2–3	US Grégorienne (7)
13.	AS Trélivan (7)	1–1 (4–5 p)	FC Bruz (7)
14.	RC Dinan (11)	1–1 (4–5 p)	FC Basse Vilaine (8)
15.	Réveil de Lohéac (9)	0–11	AS Vitré (5)
16.	Lamballe FC (6)	2–5	Loudéac OSC (6)
17.	CO Pacéen (7)	1–1 (3–4 p)	US Gosné (8)
18.	US Saint-Jouan-des-Guérets (8)	0–3	Ruffiac-Malestroit (8)
19.	Espoir Clohars Fouesnant (9)	0–1	Stade Pontivyen (6)
20.	PD Ergué-Gabéric (6)	2–1	Amicale Ergué-Gabéric (7)
21.	Espérance Bréhan (7)	0–4	Vannes OC (4)
22.	Garde Saint-Cyr Moréac (8)	2–7	ES Plescop (7)
23.	Riantec OC (7)	1–0	Saint-Colomban Sportive Locminé (5)
24.	Avenir Theix (7)	3–1	Quimper Kerfeunteun FC (6)
25.	Mélénicks Elliant (9)	0–2	ES Saint-Avé (8)
26.	FC Ploemeur (7)	2–0	Plouhinec FC (8)
27.	US Goëlands de Larmor-Plage (8)	6–0	FC Kerchopine (9)
28.	FC Quimper Penhars (9)	0–6	GSI Pontivy (5)
29.	CA Forestois (9)	2–2 (5–6 p)	Dernières Cartouches Carhaix (7)
30.	EA Scaër (7)	1–3	CEP Lorient (6)
31.	Stella Maris Douarnenez (6)	2–1	US Trégunc (6)
32.	CS Pluneret (9)	0–1	Auray FC (6)
33.	US Fouesnant (9)	1–4	Séné FC (7)
34.	US Arradon (9)	2–2 (2–3 p)	Guénin Sport (8)
35.	Baud FC (8)	4–0	ES Scrignac Poullaouen (8)
36.	Moutons Blanc de Noyal-Pontivy (7)	6–2	Châteaulin FC (7)
37.	AL Coataudon (8)	1–2	Plouzané AC (6)
38.	Arzelliz Ploudalmézeau (9)	2–2 (1–2 p)	Guiclan Plouénan FC (8)
39.	FC Lanhouarneau-Plounévez-Lochrist (9)	0–7	Landerneau FC (6)
40.	AS Tagarine (11)	0–8	Plougastel FC (6)
41.	EA Saint-Renan (7)	0–4	US Saint-Malo (4)
42.	US Briacine (9)	2–6	JU Plougonven (7)
43.	Dinan-Léhon FC (5)	0–0 (6–7 p)	Stade Plabennécois (5)
44.	Saint-Brandan-Quintin FC (7)	4–2	JS Cavan (8)
45.	US Goudelin (8)	4–1	JS Lanvollon (8)
46.	US Saint-Carreuc-Hénon (9)	0–5	AG Plouvorn (6)
47.	AS Brest (7)	3–1	ES Portsall Kersaint (7)
48.	AS Hillion-Saint-René (8)	0–4	AS Sizun-Le Tréhou (9)
49.	AS Pabu Plein Air (10)	0–2	AS Ginglin Cesson (6)
50.	AS Uzel-Merléac (8)	5–0	Saint-Pierre Plouescat (8)
51.	FC Trébeurden-Pleumeur-Bodou (8)	0–4	Lannion FC (5)
52.	AS Landeda (9)	1–1 (3–2 p)	US Perros-Louannec (8)
53.	US Langueux (7)	1–1 (7–6 p)	Ploufragan FC (7)
54.	Paotred Rosko (9)	0–5	CS Bégard (6)

=== Fifth round ===
These matches were played on 8 and 9 October 2022.

Fifth round results: Brittany
Tie no	Home team (tier)	Score	Away team (tier)
1.	AS Sizun-Le Tréhou (9)	1–7	PD Ergué-Gabéric (6)
2.	Guiclan Plouénan FC (8)	0–3	Stade Plabennécois (5)
3.	JU Plougonven (7)	2–1	Dernières Cartouches Carhaix (7)
4.	Plouzané AC (6)	0–7	Vannes OC (4)
5.	GSI Pontivy (5)	0–1	Stella Maris Douarnenez (6)
6.	Landerneau FC (6)	0–1	US Concarneau (3)
7.	Baud FC (8)	1–5	Lannion FC (5)
8.	US Goudelin (8)	0–3	Stade Pontivyen (6)
9.	AS Landeda (9)	1–3	AG Plouvorn (6)
10.	CEP Lorient (6)	3–1	CS Bégard (6)
11.	Guénin Sport (8)	1–3	Moutons Blanc de Noyal-Pontivy (7)
12.	US Goëlands de Larmor-Plage (8)	0–2	AS Brest (7)
13.	Riantec OC (7)	0–0 (4–3 p)	FC Ploemeur (7)
14.	Plougastel FC (6)	1–0	Saint-Brandan-Quintin FC (7)
15.	US Langueux (7)	0–4	US Saint-Malo (4)
16.	La Cancalaise (7)	0–1	US Fougères (5)
17.	FC Bruz (7)	3–3 (3–2 p)	OC Cesson (5)
18.	OC Montauban (7)	1–1 (3–4 p)	Loudéac OSC (6)
19.	FC Basse Vilaine (8)	0–2	Auray FC (6)
20.	Muzillac OS (7)	1–1 (4–3 p)	Jeunes d'Argentré (7)
21.	Ruffiac-Malestroit (8)	0–3	AS Vitré (5)
22.	Espérance Chartres-de-Bretagne (6)	1–1 (5–4 p)	Avenir Theix (7)
23.	FC Beauregard Rennes (8)	2–0	AS Uzel-Merléac (8)
24.	La Vitréenne FC (7)	1–2	Séné FC (7)
25.	AS Miniac-Morvan (7)	2–0	Entente Samsonnaise Doloise (5)
26.	US Gosné (8)	0–7	Stade Briochin (3)
27.	ES Saint-Avé (8)	0–1	AS Ginglin Cesson (6)
28.	ES Plescop (7)	1–4	US Grégorienne (7)

=== Sixth round ===
These matches were played on 15 and 16 October 2022.

Sixth round results: Brittany
Tie no	Home team (tier)	Score	Away team (tier)
1.	US Concarneau (3)	2–0	Stade Briochin (3)
2.	AS Ginglin Cesson (6)	0–0 (3–4 p)	AS Vitré (5)
3.	Stade Pontivyen (6)	1–1 (3–1 p)	AS Miniac-Morvan (7)
4.	PD Ergué-Gabéric (6)	5–0	FC Bruz (7)
5.	Muzillac OS (7)	1–5	Stade Plabennécois (5)
6.	Auray FC (6)	3–1	CEP Lorient (6)
7.	JU Plougonven (7)	0–6	Lannion FC (5)
8.	Loudéac OSC (6)	1–2	Espérance Chartres-de-Bretagne (6)
9.	FC Beauregard Rennes (8)	1–4	Vannes OC (4)
10.	AG Plouvorn (6)	3–1	Stella Maris Douarnenez (6)
11.	Moutons Blanc de Noyal-Pontivy (7)	0–2	US Grégorienne (7)
12.	US Fougères (5)	6–0	Plougastel FC (6)
13.	Séné FC (7)	4–0	Riantec OC (7)
14.	AS Brest (7)	0–5	US Saint-Malo (4)
