= 2021–22 Coupe de France preliminary rounds, Brittany =

The 2021–22 Coupe de France preliminary rounds, Brittany was the qualifying competition to decide which teams from the leagues of the Brittany region of France took part in the main competition from the seventh round.

A total of fourteen teams qualified from the Brittany preliminary rounds. In 2020–21, US Montagnarde progressed furthest in the main competition, reaching the round of 32 before losing to Olympique Saumur FC.

== Draws and fixtures ==
On 28 June 2021, the Brittany league announced that 701 teams had entered the competition. The first round draw was published on 29 July 2021, with 578 teams entering at that stage. The second round draw was published on 31 August 2021, with 105 teams from Régionale 2 and Régionale 1 entering at this stage. The third round draw was published on 9 September 2021, with the teams from Championnat National 3 entering at this stage. The fourth round draw was published on 23 September 2021, with the teams from Championnat National 2 entering at this stage. The fifth round draw, featuring the teams from Championnat National, was made on 6 October 2021. The sixth round draw was published on 20 October 2021.

=== First round ===
These matches were played on 29 August 2021, with one postponed until 5 September 2021.

First round results: Brittany
Tie no	Home team (tier)	Score	Away team (tier)
1.	AS Belle-Île-en-Mer (10)	1–1 (4–5 p)	US Brech (8)
2.	US Plouisy (8)	1–4	Union Squiffiec-Trégonneau (9)
3.	ES Frout Saint-Agathon (10)	0–2	CS Rospez (10)
4.	FC Trébeurden-Pleumeur-Bodou (8)	3–0 (Note: Tie won by means of forfeit.)	UO Trégor (9)
5.	Goëlands de Plouézec FC (12)	2–1	US Kérity (9)
6.	ES Rudonou (10)	1–2	Avenir du Goëlo (8)
7.	AS Ploumilliau (9)	2–1	Entente du Trieux FC (9)
8.	AS Servel-Lannion (9)	2–1	JS Lanvollon (8)
9.	Stade Kénanais (10)	0–0 (4–3 p)	US Pluzunet-Tonquédec (10)
10.	CS Trégastel (11)	1–2	JS Cavan (8)
11.	Méné Bré Sports Pédernec (9)	1–1 (4–2 p)	JA Penvénan (10)
12.	US Trieux-Lézardrieux-Pleudaniel (9)	5–0	FC Trélévern-Trévou (9)
13.	ES Plougrasienne (11)	0–1	AS Plestinaise (9)
14.	US Ploubezre (9)	1–3	Trégor FC (8)
15.	FC Lizildry (10)	0–3	AS Pleubian-Pleumeur (9)
16.	SC Trédarzec (12)	3–0	AS Trédrez-Locquémeau (8)
17.	AS Kérien-Magoar (10)	1–4	AS Pabu Plein Air (10)
18.	AS Saint-Herve (9)	2–2 (4–2 p)	AS Trémuson (9)
19.	Trieux FC (10)	0–0 (3–5 p)	Goëlo FC (8)
20.	US Kergristoise (12)	1–2	RC Plusquellec (10)
21.	ASL Saint-Julien (10)	6–0	AS Saint-Émilion (10)
22.	AS Plélo (9)	2–1	Plounévez-Lanrivain-Trémargat US (9)
23.	AS Tagarine (12)	1–1 (4–2 p)	US Callac (10)
24.	AS Plenaltais Plaine-Haute (11)	1–1 (3–2 p)	ES Le Fœil (9)
25.	US Tréglamus (10)	2–3	Rostrenen FC (8)
26.	US Maël-Carhaix (10)	0–4	Stade Charles de Blois Guingamp (9)
27.	ES Pommerit Le Merzer (9)	0–0 (15–16 p)	US Méné Bré Louargat (10)
28.	FC La Chapelle-Neuve (11)	0–7	US Briacine (10)
29.	AS Pyramide Lanfains (10)	3–0	Plouha FC (11)
30.	FC Plouagat-Châtelaudren-Lanrodec (9)	3–0	ES Guer (10)
31.	Pordic-Binic FC (8)	2–0	AS Grâces (8)
32.	US Saint-Donan (10)	0–3	FC Saint-Bugan (8)
33.	FC L'Hermitage Lorge (10)	1–1 (8–7 p)	AS Saint-Barnabé (10)
34.	FC Poulancre-Múr-Saint-Gilles (9)	0–3	Évron FC (8)
35.	FC Le Vieux Bourg (11)	1–3	JS Allineuc (10)
36.	CS Croix Lambert (9)	1–2	Gouessant Foot Coëtmieux-Andel-Morieux-Pommeret (9)
37.	AS Trégueux (8)	4–0	UF Yffiniac (9)
38.	FC Moncontour-Trédaniel (9)	0–0 (2–4 p)	JS Landéhen (10)
39.	AS Trévé Sports (10)	0–4	AS Hillion-Saint-René (8)
40.	ALSL Plémy (10)	6–2	US Saint-Caradec (9)
41.	CS Plédran (8)	5–0	La Plœucoise Foot (9)
42.	FC Kreiz Breizh (9)	2–3	FC Lié (8)
43.	Saint-Brieuc Football Ouest (10)	5–3	AS Plussulien (10)
44.	Association La Ferrière (11)	0–3	AS Motterieux (9)
45.	US Argoat-Pélem (10)	0–3	US Erquy (9)
46.	US Saint-Carreuc-Hénon (8)	3–2	Étoile du Leff Boqueho (9)
47.	ES Hénansal-Saint-Denoual-La Bouillie Emeraude (10)	1–3 (Note: Tie reversed from original draw.)	ES Noyal (11)
48.	AS Broons-Trémeur (9)	3–0	CS Lanrelas (9)
49.	FC Bourseul (12)	0–4	Val d'Arguenon Créhen-Pluduno (8)
50.	Rance FC (10)	2–0	FC Quévertois (11)
51.	US Yvignac-la-Tour (9)	1–4	Les Vallées FC (9)
52.	AS Saint-Pôtan (11)	0–2	Rance Coëtquen Football (10)
53.	FC Plélan Vildé Corseul (9)	0–2	CS Merdrignac (8)
54.	US Plouasne-Saint-Juvat (8)	2–1	FC Beaussais-Rance-Frémur (9)
55.	AL Trélat-Taden (11)	5–1	CS Illifaut (10)
56.	Stade Évrannais (8)	3–0	ES Saint-Cast-le-Guildo (9)
57.	AS Bobital-Brusvily (9)	3–0	US Trémorel (10)
58.	FC Centre Bretagne (8)	4–3	US Lanvallay (9)
59.	ES Penguily (8)	2–0	US Hunaudaye (9)
60.	RC Dinan (12)	11–0	Étoile Sud Armor Porhoët (9)
61.	FC Côte de Penthièvre (10)	3–1	ASC La Landec (11)
62.	ES Locmaria-Plouzané (9)	1–1 (4–2 p)	US Plougonvelin (8)
63.	US Aber-Benoît Tréglonou (10)	1–6	AS Guilers (8)
64.	PL Pilier Rouge (10)	2–7	AS Brest (8)
65.	Étoile Saint-Arzel (10)	0–4	FC Lampaulais (9)
66.	Association Cavale Blanche Brest (11)	2–5	AS Ploumoguer (10)
67.	AJA Brélès Lanildut (11)	2–3	ASC Mahoraise Brest (9)
68.	PL Lambézellec (10)	1–4	Légion Saint-Pierre (9)
69.	Gars Saint-Majan (10)	0–8	SC Lannilis (9)
70.	AS Queliverzan (11)	0–2	SC Lanrivoaré (9)
71.	Avel Vor Saint-Pabu (11)	2–2 (6–7 p)	Arzelliz Ploudalmézeau (9)
72.	Hermine Kernilis (10)	0–2	AS Landeda (9)
73.	FC Côte des Légendes (9)	0–2	AS Plouvien (8)
74.	PL Bergot (10)	1–2	Saint-Divy Sports (9)
75.	FC Le Drennec (10)	0–4	AS Kersaint (9)
76.	US Pencran (10)	0–5	JS Saint-Thonanaise (9)
77.	ÉS Guissenyenne (11)	1–5	Saint-Pierre Plouescat (9)
78.	VF Saint-Frégant (10)	0–3	CND Le Folgoët (8)
79.	ES Tréflez (10)	0–4	FC Lanhouarneau-Plounévez-Lochrist (9)
80.	US Saint-Servais-Saint-Derrien (11)	1–2	Gâs de Plouider (10)
81.	FC Plounéventer Plouédern (9)	0–3	Étoile Saint-Yves Ploudaniel (8)
82.	RC Loperhet (10)	0–9	FC Le Relecq-Kerhuon (8)
83.	Stade Landernéen Kergrèis (9)	3–2	AS Dirinon (8)
84.	JG Forestoise (10)	1–5	ES Mignonne (9)
85.	FA de la Rade (10)	1–0	ES Cranou (9)
86.	US Rochoise (10)	1–0	AS Sizun-Le Tréhou (9)
87.	Gars de Plouénan (9)	1–1 (5–4 p)	AS Santec (8)
88.	Paotred Rosko (10)	1–1 (4–2 p)	Stade Léonard Kreisker (9)
89.	Cadets de Plougoulm (10)	1–6	AS Berven-Plouzévédé (8)
90.	ES Lampaulaise (10)	0–4	ÉF Plougourvest (9)
91.	US Pont-Meur Guimiliau (9)	0–3	Bodilis-Plougar FC (8)
92.	FC Gars du Roc'h (12)	0–4	Avenir Plourin (10)
93.	US Mespaul (11)	1–2	US Taulé (9)
94.	FC Sainte-Sève (10)	1–5	Guiclan FC (8)
95.	La Guerlesquinaise (10)	0–2	ES Pleyber-Christ (9)
96.	US Garlan (10)	1–4	AS Saint-Martin-des-Champs (8)
97.	FC Plouezoc'h (9)	0–1	ES Carantec-Henvic (8)
98.	US Lanmeur-Plouégat-Guérand (10)	1–0	Étoile Trégoroise Plougasnou (9)
99.	ES Douron (10)	3–2	US Plouigneau (9)
100.	ES Berrien-Huelgoat (9)	0–3	ES Scrignac Poullaouen (8)
101.	AC Carhaix (9)	1–2	Gourin FC (8)
102.	AS Motreff (10)	1–2	PB Spézet (9)
103.	Toros Plounévézel (10)	2–5	Gars de Plonévez-du-Faou (9)
104.	FC Collorec (12)	2–1	US Kergloff (11)
105.	Plouyé Magic United (10)	4–2	US Landeleau (9)
106.	US Saint Hernin (11)	0–2	US Cléden-Poher (10)
107.	SS Saint-Goazec (11)	0–9	US Châteauneuf-du-Faou (9)
108.	FC Pen Hir Camaret (11)	2–1	Lanvéoc Sports (9)
109.	US Crozon-Morgat (10)	3–1	AS Telgruc-sur-Mer (9)
110.	Saint-Nic Sports (10)	0–4	AS Pont-de-Buis (9)
111.	ES Gouézec (11)	2–2 (4–2 p)	Gas du Menez-Hom (8)
112.	Saint-Thois Sports (11)	0–5	Edern Sports (9)
113.	US Lennon (11)	0–2	Stade Pleybennois (9)
114.	Écureuils de Roudouallec (11)	3–2	AS Gâs de Leuhan (10)
115.	Racing Cast-Porzay (10)	1–4	Tricolores Landrévarzec (9)
116.	US Quéménéven (10)	1–3	ÉS Plogonnec (8)
117.	FC Quimper Penhars (9)	1–1 (7–8 p)	Paotred Briec (8)
118.	AS Saint-Yvi (10)	2–0	ES Langolen (9)
119.	FC Goyen (11)	1–8	FC Penn-ar-Bed (9)
120.	Stade Pontécrucien (11)	0–2	Goulien Sports (9)
121.	AS Diables du Juch (10)	1–2	Gas d'Ys Tréboul (9)
122.	AS Plouhinec (10)	1–2	ES Beuzec (9)
123.	Pouldergat Sport (11)	1–3	ES Mahalon-Confort (10)
124.	ÉS Plonéis (10)	0–9	Lapins de Guengat (10)
125.	JS Plogastel (10)	0–9	Gourlizon Sport (8)
126.	ES Landudec-Guiler (10)	0–6	US Pluguffan (9)
127.	FC Bigouden (10)	0–7	Plonéour FC (8)
128.	FC Treffiagat-Guilvinec (10)	0–7	Cormorans Sportif de Penmarc'h (8)
129.	AS Loctudy (10)	3–1	Gars de Plomeur (9)
130.	La Raquette Tréméoc (10)	0–5	AS Plomelin (8)
131.	US Île-Tudy (11)	0–2	ÉS Saint-Jean-Trolimon (10)
132.	Marcassins Sportif Tréogat (10)	2–1	Combrit Sainte Marine FC (9)
133.	US Portugais Quimper (10)	0–3	FC Odet (9)
134.	US Saint-Évarzec (9)	1–0	Quimper Ergué-Armel FC (8)
135.	CA Forestois (10)	0–1	Espoir Clohars Fouesnant (9)
136.	FC Pleuvennois (9)	1–1 (5–2 p)	US Fouesnant (8)
137.	AS Melgven (9)	3–2	Mélénicks Elliant (8)
138.	ES Névez (9)	0–2	Hermine Concarnoise (8)
139.	Stade Mellacois (9)	2–2 (5–4 p)	Fleur de Genêt Bannalec (8)
140.	AS Tréméven (10)	3–1	Locunolé Sports (9)
141.	AS Baye (12)	0–3	FC Aven-Bélon (10)
142.	Coquelicots du Trévoux (11)	0–3	US Clohars-Carnoët (9)
143.	US Querrien (10)	2–4	ES Rédené (9)
144.	US Saint-Thurien (11)	0–3	US Quimperloise (9)
145.	AS Kernével (10)	2–0	FC Rosporden (9)
146.	AS Étrelles (10)	0–0 (4–2 p)	JA Balazé (8)
147.	JS Nouvoitou (10)	0–3	US Guignen (9)
148.	AS Vezin-le-Coquet (10)	1–5	US Tertre Gris (9)
149.	JA Pipriac (9)	3–1	US Noyal-Chatillon (9)
150.	FC des Landes (10)	2–6	Olympic Montreuil-Landavran (9)
151.	US Saint-Marc/Saint-Ouen (10)	1–2	Fougères FC (9)
152.	Torcé-Vergéal FC (10)	1–2	AS Chantepie (8)
153.	Espérance Bréal-sous-Vitré (10)	0–4	La Chapelle-Janson/Fleurigné/Laignelet-le-Louroux (8)
154.	US Chapelloise (11)	2–1	AS Saint-Jacques (9)
155.	US Cuguen (11)	0–3	La Cancalaise (8)
156.	AS Tremblay-Chauvigné (10)	0–5	FC Stéphanais Briçois (9)
157.	La Seiche FC (10)	4–0	OC Brétillien (10)
158.	Essé Le Theil FC (10)	0–5	AS Retiers-Coësmes (8)
159.	AS Livré/Mecé (10)	1–1 (1–3 p)	Entente Sens-Vieux-Vy Gahard (9)
160.	AC Redonnais (11)	2–6	Avenir Lieuron (8)
161.	Montfort-Iffendic (10)	0–2	FC Beauregard Rennes (8)
162.	AS Saint-Pierraise Épiniac (9)	0–7	AS La Gouesnière (8)
163.	FC Baulon-Lassy (10)	0–2	FC La Chapelle-Montgermont (8)
164.	US Baguer-Morvan (10)	1–5	FC Tinténiac-Saint-Domineuc (9)
165.	AS Montreuil-le-Gast (10)	1–1 (3–0 p)	SC Goven (10)
166.	AS Romillé (11)	1–3	US Le Crouais (10)
167.	Triangle FC (11)	1–4	US Sainte-Marie (10)
168.	Stade Castelbourgeois FC (9)	3–1	US Gévezé (8)
169.	US Val d'Izé (9)	2–2 (2–4 p)	AS Ercé-près-Liffré (9)
170.	US Les Brulais-Comblessac (11)	0–3	Espérance Sixt-sur-Aff (9)
171.	Omnisports Suliaçais (11)	1–4	CS La Richardais (10)
172.	FC Bord de Rance (10)	1–2	Cercle Jules Ferry Saint Malo (9)
173.	US Sens-de-Bretagne (10)	1–3	US Acigné (8)
174.	Cercle Paul Bert Nord-Ouest (11)	2–1	Espérance de Rennes (9)
175.	US Domagné-Saint-Didier (9)	1–1 (5–4 p)	Bleuets Le Pertre-Brielles-Gennes-Saint-Cyr (8)
176.	FC Meillac-Lanhélin-Bonnemain (10)	1–2	JA Saint-Servan (8)
177.	JS Picanaise (9)	0–5	AS Jacques Cartier (8)
178.	US Médréac (10)	1–4	USC Chavagne (9)
179.	Breizh Fobal Klub (9)	1–2	Stade Louvignéen (8)
180.	FC Plélan-Maxent (9)	0–6	Cercle Paul Bert Gayeulles (9)
181.	FC La Mézière-Melesse (9)	2–2 (5–4 p)	Noyal-Brécé FC (8)
182.	ASC Saint-Erblon (10)	0–4	JA Bréal (8)
183.	Combourg SC (12)	3–0	La Mélorienne (9)
184.	Avenir Domalain (10)	0–1	Cadets Chelun Martigné-Ferchaud (9)
185.	FC Baie du Mont Saint-Michel (9)	1–1 (4–2 p)	US Saint-Jouan-des-Guérets (8)
186.	Haute Vilaine FC (10)	0–3	ASC Romagné (8)
187.	Hermine La Noë Blanche (9)	0–3	US Janzé (8)
188.	US Gosné (9)	0–0 (4–5 p)	US Illet Forêt (8)
189.	US Bel Air (9)	1–1 (4–5 p)	ES Thorigné-Fouillard (8)
190.	AS Parthenay-de-Bretagne (10)	0–10	Avenir Irodouër (8)
191.	Cercle Paul Bert Cleunay (10)	0–3	SEP Quédillac (8)
192.	US Orgères (10)	3–2	Réveil de Lohéac (10)
193.	US Saint-Guinoux (10)	0–3	US Château-Malo (8)
194.	AS Saint-Malo-de-Phily (10)	0–1	FC Pays d'Anast (9)
195.	FC Grand-Fougeray Sainte-Anne (10)	1–7	FC Canton du Sel (11)
196.	US Saint-Méen-Saint-Onen (9)	1–1 (4–5 p)	AC Rennes (8)
197.	US Erbrée-Mondevert (10)	1–2	Espérance La Bouëxière (9)
198.	Indépendante Saint-Georges-de-Chesné (9)	0–2	CS Betton (8)
199.	La Baussaine-Saint-Thual FC (12)	0–10	FC Mordelles (9)
200.	US Pont-Péan (10)	0–5	Domloup Sport (8)
201.	Entente Parigné/Landéan (10)	1–0	Association Châtillon-en-Vendelais/Princé (9)
202.	ASE Lécousse (9)	2–5	CS Servon (8)
203.	Le Reveil Seglinois (11)	1–2	US Gaël Muel (9)
204.	Cercle Paul Bert Villejean-Beauregard (11)	0–3	US Bédée-Pleumeleuc (8)
205.	JA Pléchâtel (11)	0–4	US Saint-Armel (10)
206.	Groupe Saint-Yves Saint-Just (10)	0–10	US Bourgbarré (9)
207.	SC Luitré-Dompierre (11)	1–3	FC Louvigné-La Bazouge (9)
208.	AS Saint-Pern/Landujan (10)	0–3	Pleurtuit Côte d'Emeraude (8)
209.	Hermine de Renac (10)	0–2	US Bain (9)
210.	ES Saint-Germain/Montours (9)	0–1	Stade Saint-Aubinais (8)
211.	ÉS Saint-Aubin-des-Landes/EF Cornillé (10)	1–2	US Vern-sur-Seiche (8)
212.	Ajoncs d'Or Saint-Malguénac (9)	3–0	AS Saint-Barthélemy (10)
213.	US Langoëlan-Ploërdut (10)	4–4 (5–3 p)	CS Pluméliau (8)
214.	AS Priziac (10)	1–4	Avenir Guiscriff (9)
215.	SC Sournais (9)	11–0	ES Langonnet (10)
216.	US Le Faouët (11)	0–3	ACS Bieuzy-les-Eaux (11)
217.	Avenir du Pays Pourleth (9)	4–1	Melrand Sports (9)
218.	ES Ségliennaise (10)	0–2	Stade Guémenois (9)
219.	FC Guilligomarc'h (12)	3–8	JA Arzano (9)
220.	Caudan SF (9)	0–2	AS Lanester (8)
221.	AS Bubry (11)	0–3 (Note: Match abandoned. FC Klegereg qualify.)	FC Klegereg (8)
222.	ASPTT Lorient (12)	0–3	AS Guermeur (11)
223.	FC Kerzec (11)	0–3	FOLC Lorient Ouest (10)
224.	FL Inguiniel (10)	1–4	US Goëlands de Larmor-Plage (8)
225.	FC Meslan (10)	0–0 (6–5 p)	CS Quéven (8)
226.	AS Calanaise (9)	1–8	La Guideloise (9)
227.	FC Kerchopine (10)	8–0	ASC Kernascléden Lignol (11)
228.	US Berné (11)	0–5 (Note: First match abandoned after 42 minutes, with the scoreline 0–1, due to serious injury. Replayed 5 September.)	AS Gestel (8)
229.	AS Kergonan (9)	2–4	Stade Gavrais (10)
230.	Avenir Sainte-Hélène (9)	8–0	US Groix (10)
231.	ES Merlevenez (9)	1–4	Saint-Efflam Kervignac (8)
232.	FC Quistinic (10)	3–1	AS Pluvignoise (10)
233.	AL Camors (9)	1–3	Plouhinec FC (8)
234.	Riantec OC (8)	4–0	Baud FC (8)
235.	US Bieuzy-Lanvaux (11)	1–3	Stade Landévantais (9)
236.	Stade Hennebontais (9)	1–4	ES Sud Outre Rade (8)
237.	Entente Saint-Gilloise (10)	5–0	Lanester FC (9)
238.	CS Pluneret (9)	2–1	ASC Sainte-Anne-d'Auray (9)
239.	ASC Baden (10)	2–5	FC Quiberon Saint-Pierre (8)
240.	FC Locmariaquer-Saint-Philibert (9)	3–1	AS Plouharnel (10)
241.	AS Plougoumelen-Bono (9)	4–0	ES Mériadec (9)
242.	Erdeven-Étel Foot (10)	5–2	Hermine Locoal-Mendon (10)
243.	ES Ploemel (8)	3–2	ES Crac'h (9)
244.	AS Bélugas Belz (8)	0–2	US Ploeren (9)
245.	Landaul Sports (8)	3–0	Carnac FC (9)
246.	FC Gueltas Saint-Gérand Saint-Gonnery (11)	1–5	Garde Saint-Cyr Moréac (8)
247.	AS Kergrist (10)	0–2	La Locminoise (10)
248.	ES Remungol (10)	3–0	Garde Saint-Arnould Saint-Allouestre (11)
249.	FC Naizin (8)	2–1	AS Moustoir-Ac (9)
250.	Garde Saint-Eloi Kerfourn (9)	2–0	Bleuets de Crédin (10)
251.	AS Brévelaise (10)	2–1	Paotred du Tarun (10)
252.	Plumelin Sports (11)	0–3	Saint-Clair Réguiny (10)
253.	Garde du Gohazé Saint Thuriau (10)	3–2	EFC Saint-Jean Brévelay (8)
254.	US Rohannaise (10)	2–0	Guénin Sport (8)
255.	Chevaliers Saint-Maurice Saint-Guyomard (10)	1–2	Cadets de Guéhenno (10)
256.	La Mélécienne de Plumelec (9)	1–2	La Sérentaise (10)
257.	ES Colpo (10)	3–0	AS Turcs de l'Ouest (10)
258.	Prat Poulfanc Sport (10)	1–2	AS Meucon (10)
259.	Garde du Loch (9)	5–2	US Le Cours (10)
260.	Cercle Saint-Martin Trédion (11)	2–7	Rah-Koëd Plaudren FC (9)
261.	Ajoncs d'Or Saint-Nolff (10)	2–4	Semeurs de Grand-Champ (9)
262.	US Arradon (8)	4–2	AS Monterblanc (9)
263.	AS Cruguel (8)	0–2	ES Saint-Avé (8)
264.	Entente Mohon-Saint-Malo-des-Trois-Fontaines (10)	0–5	AS Croix-Helléan (10)
265.	Avenir Buléon-Lantillac (10)	4–0	Garde de l'Yvel Loyat (10)
266.	US Saint-Abraham Chapelle-Caro (9)	4–0	Avenir Campénéac Augan (9)
267.	Enfants de Saint-Gildas (8)	0–2	Aurore de Taupont (9)
268.	Saint-Pierre Pleugriffet (10)	1–2	Ecureils Roc-Saint-André (9)
269.	Vigilante Radenac (11)	0–5	Saint-Hubert Sport Lanouée (9)
270.	Avenir de Guilliers (10)	4–4 (1–4 p)	Bleuets Néant-sur-Yvel (10)
271.	Avenir Saint-Servant-sur-Oust (9)	2–1	Garde de Mi-Voie Guillac (10)
272.	Saint-Jean de Villenard Sports (10)	0–4	CS Josselin (8)
273.	FC Saint-Perreux (9)	1–2	JA Pleucadeuc (10)
274.	Saint-Léon de Glénac (10)	2–5	FC Cournon 56 (10)
275.	ES Quelneuc (10)	1–3	Espoir Saint-Jacut-les-Pins (8)
276.	JA Peillac (10)	0–3	Ruffiac-Malestroit (8)
277.	Avenir Saint-Vincent-sur-Oust (10)	1–3	Les Fougerêts-Saint-Martin-sur-Oust (9)
278.	AS La Claie (10)	1–2	Caro/Missiriac AS (9)
279.	Gentienne Pluherlin (10)	0–4	La Patriote Malansac (8)
280.	OC Beignon (10)	1–1 (6–7 p)	Fondelienne Carentoir (9)
281.	Muzillac OS (8)	2–0	Saint-Sébastien Caden (9)
282.	ES Surzur (10)	0–1	ES Larré-Molac (10)
283.	FC Basse Vilaine (8)	2–3	CS Saint-Gaudence Allaire (9)
284.	AS Berric-Lauzach (9)	0–4 (Note: Match abandoned when AS Berric-Lauzach did not want to continue after an injury to one of their players. Garde du Pont Marzan qualify.)	Garde du Pont Marzan (8)
285.	Damgan-Ambon Sport (9)	1–1 (2–4 p)	Bogue D'Or Questembert (8)
286.	US Saint-Melaine Rieux (8)	3–0	AS Saint-Eloi La Vraie-Croix (9)
287.	Montagnards Sulniac (9)	3–2	Sarzeau FC (8)
288.	JF Noyal-Muzillac (9)	1–1 (3–0 p)	AG Arzal (9)
289.	Saint-Clair Limerzel (11)	0–1	Armoricaine Péaule (9)

=== Second round ===
These matches were played on 5 September 2021, with one postponed until 12 September 2021.

Second round results: Brittany
Tie no	Home team (tier)	Score	Away team (tier)
1.	AS Landeda (9)	1–3	Espérance Plouguerneau (7)
2.	AS Ploumoguer (10)	0–4	CND Le Folgoët (8)
3.	FC Lampaulais (9)	4–0	SC Lanrivoaré (9)
4.	Arzelliz Ploudalmézeau (9)	1–0	ES Portsall Kersaint (7)
5.	AS Plouvien (8)	1–0	AS Guilers (8)
6.	SC Lannilis (9)	2–4	ASPTT Brest (7)
7.	ES Locmaria-Plouzané (9)	0–5	Vie au Grand Air Bohars (7)
8.	Légion Saint-Pierre (9)	2–1	EA Saint-Renan (6)
9.	Gars de Saint-Yves (7)	2–1	Guipavas GdR (6)
10.	Étoile Saint-Yves Ploudaniel (8)	3–3 (2–4 p)	Stade Landernéen Kergrèis (9)
11.	JS Saint-Thonanaise (9)	1–5	FC Gouesnou (7)
12.	AS Kersaint (9)	0–3	RC Lesnevien (7)
13.	FC Lanhouarneau-Plounévez-Lochrist (9)	2–0	Saint-Divy Sports (9)
14.	ASC Mahoraise Brest (9)	3–4	Landi FC (7)
15.	Gâs de Plouider (10)	0–11	AS Berven-Plouzévédé (8)
16.	US Rochoise (10)	0–2	US Cléder (8)
17.	US Lanmeur-Plouégat-Guérand (10)	0–3	Guiclan FC (8)
18.	ES Douron (10)	0–8	AG Plouvorn (7)
19.	Avenir Plourin (10)	1–2	Paotred Rosko (10)
20.	ÉF Plougourvest (9)	1–2	AS Saint-Martin-des-Champs (8)
21.	Bodilis-Plougar FC (8)	1–0	ES Pleyber-Christ (9)
22.	ES Carantec-Henvic (8)	1–1 (4–3 p)	JU Plougonven (7)
23.	ES Saint-Thégonnec (7)	0–4	SC Morlaix (7)
24.	US Taulé (9)	1–3	Gars de Plouénan (9)
25.	PB Spézet (9)	1–6	Dernières Cartouches Carhaix (8)
26.	Stade Pleybennois (9)	0–10	Châteaulin FC (6)
27.	Saint-Pierre Plouescat (9)	1–6	Landerneau FC (6)
28.	US Châteauneuf-du-Faou (9)	0–10	Plougastel FC (7)
29.	US Cléden-Poher (10)	1–3	FA de la Rade (10)
30.	ES Scrignac Poullaouen (8)	0–3	Étoile Saint Laurent (7)
31.	ES Mignonne (9)	8–0	Plouyé Magic United (10)
32.	Gars de Plonévez-du-Faou (9)	0–5	AL Coataudon (8)
33.	FC Collorec (12)	1–6	AS Brest (8)
34.	AS Pont-de-Buis (9)	0–1	FC Le Relecq-Kerhuon (8)
35.	FC Penn-ar-Bed (9)	0–0 (5–3 p)	AS Plomelin (8)
36.	Gas d'Ys Tréboul (9)	1–2	Amicale Italia Bretagne (7)
37.	FC Pen Hir Camaret (11)	0–2	Gourlizon Sport (8)
38.	Goulien Sports (9)	1–0	ES Mahalon-Confort (10)
39.	Lapins de Guengat (10)	0–5	Stella Maris Douarnenez (6)
40.	ÉS Plogonnec (8)	2–1	US Quimperoise (7)
41.	Tricolores Landrévarzec (9)	0–2	US Crozon-Morgat (10)
42.	ES Beuzec (9)	0–2	La Plozévetienne (8)
43.	Edern Sports (9)	2–4	Quimper Kerfeunteun FC (7)
44.	FC Odet (9)	1–2	Glaziks de Coray (8)
45.	US Pluguffan (9)	2–7	FC Pont-l'Abbé (7)
46.	Cormorans Sportif de Penmarc'h (8)	0–0 (5–4 p)	AS Plobannalec-Lesconil (6)
47.	ÉS Saint-Jean-Trolimon (10)	0–6	US Saint-Évarzec (9)
48.	AS Loctudy (10)	4–1	Paotred Briec (8)
49.	Marcassins Sportif Tréogat (10)	5–2	ES Gouézec (11)
50.	Plonéour FC (8)	0–0 (4–5 p)	FC Pleuvennois (9)
51.	AS Melgven (9)	0–9	PD Ergué-Gabéric (6)
52.	AS Tréméven (10)	2–6	EA Scaër (7)
53.	Écureuils de Roudouallec (11)	0–8	US Quimperloise (9)
54.	ES Rédené (9)	3–5	FC Aven-Bélon (10)
55.	US Clohars-Carnoët (9)	0–2	FC Quimperlois (7)
56.	AS Saint-Yvi (10)	1–1 (11–10 p)	Gourin FC (8)
57.	Espoir Clohars Fouesnant (9)	0–6	Amicale Ergué-Gabéric (8)
58.	Stade Mellacois (9)	0–7	US Moëlan (7)
59.	AS Kernével (10)	1–5	Hermine Concarnoise (8)
60.	FC Louvigné-La Bazouge (9)	1–2	FC Baie du Mont Saint-Michel (9)
61.	Combourg SC (12)	3–3 (4–2 p)	JA Saint-Servan (8)
62.	AS Jacques Cartier (8)	1–0	Entente Samsonnaise Doloise (6)
63.	FC Mordelles (9)	0–3	CO Pacéen (7)
64.	Cercle Paul Bert Nord-Ouest (11)	0–2	FC La Chapelle-Montgermont (8)
65.	FC Tinténiac-Saint-Domineuc (9)	1–1 (4–2 p)	La Cancalaise (8)
66.	US Acigné (8)	0–12	OC Cesson (6)
67.	Cercle Jules Ferry Saint Malo (9)	2–1	Pleurtuit Côte d'Emeraude (8)
68.	AS Ercé-près-Liffré (9)	1–3	US Illet Forêt (8)
69.	FC La Mézière-Melesse (9)	3–1	Jeunesse Combourgeoise (7)
70.	AS Montreuil-le-Gast (10)	1–11	Stade Saint-Aubinais (8)
71.	ES Thorigné-Fouillard (8)	4–2	US Saint-Gilles (7)
72.	Entente Sens-Vieux-Vy Gahard (9)	0–6	AS Miniac-Morvan (7)
73.	FC Aubinois (8)	0–4	US Liffré (6)
74.	Cercle Paul Bert Gayeulles (9)	0–3	US Grégorienne (6)
75.	Fougères FC (9)	3–1	La Chapelle-Janson/Fleurigné/Laignelet-le-Louroux (8)
76.	FC Beauregard Rennes (8)	2–2 (3–5 p)	SC Le Rheu (6)
77.	Espérance La Bouëxière (9)	0–4	AS Vignoc-Hédé-Guipel (6)
78.	AS La Gouesnière (8)	2–0	FC Dinardais (7)
79.	Entente Parigné/Landéan (10)	1–7	ASC Romagné (8)
80.	FC Stéphanais Briçois (9)	0–4	US Billé-Javené (7)
81.	CS Servon (8)	1–2	CS Betton (8)
82.	CS La Richardais (10)	2–3	US Château-Malo (8)
83.	US Le Crouais (10)	0–0 (1–3 p)	US Gaël Muel (9)
84.	US Sainte-Marie (10)	0–12	FC Atlantique Vilaine (6)
85.	AS Retiers-Coësmes (8)	2–1	Jeunes d'Argentré (7)
86.	Avenir Irodouër (8)	0–5	Eskouadenn de Brocéliande (7)
87.	US Bain (9)	1–3	Cercle Paul Bert Bréquigny (7)
88.	Avenir Lieuron (8)	3–1	FC Hermitage-Chapelle-Cintré (7)
89.	Domloup Sport (8)	1–1 (7–6 p)	Stade Castelbourgeois FC (9)
90.	US Orgères (10)	0–6	Espérance Chartres-de-Bretagne (6)
91.	AS Étrelles (10)	0–2	RC Rannée-La Guerche-Drouges (7)
92.	FC Pays d'Anast (9)	2–3	Cadets de Bains (7)
93.	US Bourgbarré (9)	2–1	Stade Louvignéen (8)
94.	FC Canton du Sel (11)	0–4	Olympic Montreuil-Landavran (9)
95.	US Saint-Armel (10)	4–0	US Chapelloise (11)
96.	USC Chavagne (9)	0–2	AC Rennes (8)
97.	La Seiche FC (10)	1–3	La Vitréenne FC (7)
98.	US Bédée-Pleumeleuc (8)	0–2	OC Montauban (7)
99.	FC Bruz (8)	1–4	FC Breteil-Talensac (6)
100.	US Vern-sur-Seiche (8)	1–2	JA Pipriac (9)
101.	Espérance Sixt-sur-Aff (9)	1–5	US Laillé (7)
102.	JA Bréal (8)	1–4	SEP Quédillac (8)
103.	US Guignen (9)	0–3	US Châteaugiron (7)
104.	US Janzé (8)	2–0	US Domagné-Saint-Didier (9)
105.	AS Chantepie (8)	0–7	FC Guichen (6)
106.	Cadets Chelun Martigné-Ferchaud (9)	1–3	US Tertre Gris (9)
107.	AS Pabu Plein Air (10)	1–1 (2–4 p)	RC Ploumagoar (7)
108.	CS Rospez (10)	0–3	JS Cavan (8)
109.	Goëlands de Plouézec FC (12)	0–4	US Briacine (10)
110.	US Trieux-Lézardrieux-Pleudaniel (9)	2–1	AS Ploumilliau (9)
111.	Trégor FC (8)	6–1	AS Pleubian-Pleumeur (9)
112.	US Méné Bré Louargat (10)	1–7	Stade Paimpolais FC (6)
113.	SC Trédarzec (12)	0–1	CS Bégard (6)
114.	Avenir du Goëlo (8)	2–4	US Perros-Louannec (7)
115.	Méné Bré Sports Pédernec (9)	6–1	Stade Kénanais (10)
116.	Stade Charles de Blois Guingamp (9)	2–3	FC Trébeurden-Pleumeur-Bodou (8)
117.	US Goudelin (7)	4–0	US Pays Rochois et Langoatais (8)
118.	RC Plusquellec (10)	1–13	AS Plestinaise (9)
119.	Union Squiffiec-Trégonneau (9)	0–0 (4–2 p)	AS Servel-Lannion (9)
120.	JS Allineuc (10)	0–6	Pordic-Binic FC (8)
121.	AS Pyramide Lanfains (10)	0–2	FC Saint-Bugan (8)
122.	AS Saint-Herve (9)	2–9	Loudéac OSC (6)
123.	FC Centre Bretagne (8)	1–0	Ploufragan FC (7)
124.	AS Motterieux (9)	0–4	AS Trégueux (8)
125.	AS Tagarine (12)	2–1	ALSL Plémy (10)
126.	FC L'Hermitage Lorge (10)	1–3	FC La Croix-Corlay (8)
127.	Goëlo FC (8)	1–2	US Saint-Carreuc-Hénon (8)
128.	AS Uzel-Merléac (7)	0–1	US Langueux (6)
129.	FC Lié (8)	3–3 (5–3 p)	Plérin FC (7)
130.	ASL Saint-Julien (10)	0–1	AS Plélo (9)
131.	AS Plenaltais Plaine-Haute (11)	0–2	Saint-Brandan-Quintin FC (7)
132.	FC Plouagat-Châtelaudren-Lanrodec (9)	2–4	Plaintel SF (7)
133.	Rostrenen FC (8)	1–3	CS Plédran (8)
134.	Les Vallées FC (9)	2–0	AS Broons-Trémeur (9)
135.	FC Côte de Penthièvre (10)	0–2	AS Trélivan (7)
136.	Saint-Brieuc Football Ouest (10)	0–5	ES Penguily (8)
137.	AL Trélat-Taden (11)	1–3	Val d'Arguenon Créhen-Pluduno (8)
138.	US Plouasne-Saint-Juvat (8)	0–6	US Quessoy (6)
139.	CS Merdrignac (8)	3–2	US Erquy (9)
140.	ES Noyal (11)	1–7	CO Briochin Sportif Ploufraganais (7)
141.	AS Bobital-Brusvily (9)	1–0	Rance FC (10)
142.	RC Dinan (12)	8–1	Rance Coëtquen Football (10)
143.	AS Hillion-Saint-René (8)	0–6	Lamballe FC (6)
144.	JS Landéhen (10)	0–8	Stade Pleudihennais (7)
145.	Évron FC (8)	0–0 (3–4 p)	US Frémur-Fresnaye (7)
146.	Gouessant Foot Coëtmieux-Andel-Morieux-Pommeret (9)	0–5	AS Ginglin Cesson (6)
147.	Plancoët-Arguenon FC (7)	4–1	Stade Évrannais (8)
148.	Stiren Cléguer FC (9)	0–3	CEP Lorient (6)
149.	ES Sud Outre Rade (8)	0–0 (5–4 p)	FC Plouay (7)
150.	La Guideloise (9)	5–1	Avenir du Pays Pourleth (9)
151.	FOLC Lorient Ouest (10)	4–1	US Langoëlan-Ploërdut (10)
152.	Stade Gavrais (10)	0–5	FC Ploemeur (7)
153.	AS Lanester (8)	4–2	Stade Guémenois (9)
154.	FC Kerchopine (10)	2–7	Lorient Sports (7)
155.	JA Arzano (9)	1–3	FC Meslan (10)
156.	US Goëlands de Larmor-Plage (8)	2–0	Avenir Guiscriff (9)
157.	Entente Saint-Gilloise (10)	2–6	Languidic FC (7)
158.	Stade Landévantais (9)	0–5	Riantec OC (8)
159.	FC Quistinic (10)	0–5	US Montagnarde (6)
160.	ES Remungol (10)	0–4	Moutons Blanc de Noyal-Pontivy (7)
161.	Plouhinec FC (8)	6–1	SC Sournais (9)
162.	FC Klegereg (8)	4–0	Garde Saint-Eloi Kerfourn (9)
163.	Ajoncs d'Or Saint-Malguénac (9)	2–0	Avenir Sainte-Hélène (9)
164.	Saint-Efflam Kervignac (8)	0–2	Landaul Sports (8)
165.	ACS Bieuzy-les-Eaux (11)	1–2	Erdeven-Étel Foot (10)
166.	Garde du Gohazé Saint Thuriau (10)	0–1	FC Quiberon Saint-Pierre (8)
167.	AS Croix-Helléan (10)	0–3	Espérance Bréhan (7)
168.	Bleuets Néant-sur-Yvel (10)	0–13	Ploërmel FC (6)
169.	Aurore de Taupont (9)	0–1	US Saint-Abraham Chapelle-Caro (9)
170.	Cadets de Guéhenno (10)	0–3	CS Josselin (8)
171.	Saint-Clair Réguiny (10)	1–0	US Rohannaise (10)
172.	Avenir Buléon-Lantillac (10)	0–1	Indépendante Mauronnaise (9)
173.	Caro/Missiriac AS (9)	0–1	Avenir Saint-Servant-sur-Oust (9)
174.	La Locminoise (10)	0–8	Ecureils Roc-Saint-André (9)
175.	Garde Saint-Cyr Moréac (8)	9–0	Saint-Hubert Sport Lanouée (9)
176.	Enfants de Guer (7)	1–0	FC Naizin (8)
177.	Rah-Koëd Plaudren FC (9)	3–4	Keriolets de Pluvigner (6)
178.	US Arradon (8)	0–2	Auray FC (6)
179.	ES Ploemel (8)	4–2	CS Pluneret (9)
180.	ES Plescop (7)	2–2 (3–4 p)	CS Bignan (7)
181.	AS Meucon (10)	0–1	Semeurs de Grand-Champ (9)
182.	AS Brévelaise (10)	1–9	FC Locmariaquer-Saint-Philibert (9)
183.	US Ploeren (9)	0–4	AS Ménimur (7)
184.	ES Colpo (10)	2–2 (5–4 p)	ES Saint-Avé (8)
185.	US Brech (8)	4–1	AS Plougoumelen-Bono (9)
186.	Garde du Loch (9)	2–3	Elvinoise Foot (7)
187.	JF Noyal-Muzillac (9)	0–2	US La Gacilly (7)
188.	Muzillac OS (8)	1–0	Séné FC (6)
189.	CS Saint-Gaudence Allaire (9)	0–4	Ruffiac-Malestroit (8)
190.	Montagnards Sulniac (9)	3–3 (4–3 p)	Avenir Theix (7)
191.	Armoricaine Péaule (9)	1–2	US Saint-Melaine Rieux (8)
192.	ES Larré-Molac (10)	2–3	Espoir Saint-Jacut-les-Pins (8)
193.	FC Cournon 56 (10)	1–3	Bogue D'Or Questembert (8)
194.	JA Pleucadeuc (10)	3–2	La Patriote Malansac (8)
195.	La Sérentaise (10)	1–1 (2–4 p)	Fondelienne Carentoir (9)
196.	Garde du Pont Marzan (8)	6–0	Les Fougerêts-Saint-Martin-sur-Oust (9)
197.	AS Guermeur (11)	1–5	AS Gestel (8)

=== Third round ===
These matches were played on 18 and 19 September 2021.

Third round results: Brittany
Tie no	Home team (tier)	Score	Away team (tier)
1.	US Perros-Louannec (7)	5–2	Trégor FC (8)
2.	AS Plélo (9)	1–6	Stade Paimpolais FC (6)
3.	Méné Bré Sports Pédernec (9)	2–3	US Goudelin (7)
4.	AS Tagarine (12)	0–6	CO Briochin Sportif Ploufraganais (7)
5.	Pordic-Binic FC (8)	0–4	Lannion FC (5)
6.	AS Plestinaise (9)	3–1	US Briacine (10)
7.	Union Squiffiec-Trégonneau (9)	0–7	AS Ginglin Cesson (6)
8.	FC Trébeurden-Pleumeur-Bodou (8)	0–0 (0–3 p)	US Trieux-Lézardrieux-Pleudaniel (9)
9.	CS Bégard (6)	2–0	Saint-Brandan-Quintin FC (7)
10.	RC Ploumagoar (7)	3–0	JS Cavan (8)
11.	US Quessoy (6)	1–2	Plancoët-Arguenon FC (7)
12.	AS Trégueux (8)	1–2	ES Penguily (8)
13.	Stade Pleudihennais (7)	2–0	US Frémur-Fresnaye (7)
14.	RC Dinan (12)	2–1	FC Lié (8)
15.	Plaintel SF (7)	5–1	Val d'Arguenon Créhen-Pluduno (8)
16.	CS Plédran (8)	5–0	AS Bobital-Brusvily (9)
17.	US Saint-Carreuc-Hénon (8)	3–3 (4–5 p)	FC Centre Bretagne (8)
18.	Les Vallées FC (9)	3–1	CS Merdrignac (8)
19.	FC Saint-Bugan (8)	2–7	Lamballe FC (6)
20.	US Langueux (6)	1–4	Dinan-Léhon FC (5)
21.	AS Trélivan (7)	1–0	Loudéac OSC (6)
22.	Arzelliz Ploudalmézeau (9)	1–1 (5–4 p)	Plouzané AC (5)
23.	Légion Saint-Pierre (9)	0–0 (1–4 p)	FC Gouesnou (7)
24.	FC Lampaulais (9)	1–0	AS Plouvien (8)
25.	CND Le Folgoët (8)	2–4	ASPTT Brest (7)
26.	Guiclan FC (8)	1–3	Gars de Saint-Yves (7)
27.	FC Lanhouarneau-Plounévez-Lochrist (9)	1–0	ES Carantec-Henvic (8)
28.	Vie au Grand Air Bohars (7)	1–1 (5–3 p)	AS Saint-Martin-des-Champs (8)
29.	Espérance Plouguerneau (7)	3–1	RC Lesnevien (7)
30.	AS Berven-Plouzévédé (8)	0–5	Landerneau FC (6)
31.	Paotred Rosko (10)	0–0 (5–3 p)	US Cléder (8)
32.	Plougastel FC (7)	1–3	Saint-Pierre de Milizac (5)
33.	ES Mignonne (9)	5–2	Landi FC (7)
34.	AS Brest (8)	5–0	Stade Landernéen Kergrèis (9)
35.	Étoile Saint Laurent (7)	1–1 (2–4 p)	ÉS Plogonnec (8)
36.	FC Le Relecq-Kerhuon (8)	1–3	Châteaulin FC (6)
37.	AL Coataudon (8)	2–1	Stella Maris Douarnenez (6)
38.	SC Morlaix (7)	1–0	Bodilis-Plougar FC (8)
39.	US Crozon-Morgat (10)	0–2	FA de la Rade (10)
40.	Dernières Cartouches Carhaix (8)	7–0	Gars de Plouénan (9)
41.	Gourlizon Sport (8)	2–3	AG Plouvorn (7)
42.	US Moëlan (7)	7–2	Hermine Concarnoise (8)
43.	FC Quimperlois (7)	1–3	US Trégunc (5)
44.	US Saint-Évarzec (9)	0–2	La Plozévetienne (8)
45.	FC Pleuvennois (9)	2–2 (2–4 p)	US Quimperloise (9)
46.	Cormorans Sportif de Penmarc'h (8)	1–1 (2–4 p)	Goulien Sports (9)
47.	AS Loctudy (10)	0–0 (3–4 p)	Amicale Ergué-Gabéric (8)
48.	EA Scaër (7)	3–0	Glaziks de Coray (8)
49.	Marcassins Sportif Tréogat (10)	0–15	PD Ergué-Gabéric (6)
50.	FC Aven-Bélon (10)	0–4	Quimper Kerfeunteun FC (7)
51.	AS Saint-Yvi (10)	0–4	Amicale Italia Bretagne (7)
52.	FC Penn-ar-Bed (9)	0–6	FC Pont-l'Abbé (7)
53.	FC La Croix-Corlay (8)	2–2 (5–4 p)	FC Klegereg (8)
54.	US Saint-Abraham Chapelle-Caro (9)	1–1 (3–0 p)	Ruffiac-Malestroit (8)
55.	Lorient Sports (7)	2–1	Espérance Bréhan (7)
56.	CEP Lorient (6)	0–1	Ploërmel FC (6)
57.	JA Pleucadeuc (10)	0–2	Plouhinec FC (8)
58.	ES Sud Outre Rade (8)	0–4	Muzillac OS (8)
59.	Semeurs de Grand-Champ (9)	0–2	GSI Pontivy (5)
60.	US Saint-Melaine Rieux (8)	5–1	FC Quiberon Saint-Pierre (8)
61.	Garde Saint-Cyr Moréac (8)	1–7	Stade Pontivyen (5)
62.	AS Gestel (8)	0–3	Elvinoise Foot (7)
63.	FC Meslan (10)	1–1 (4–2 p)	Landaul Sports (8)
64.	Riantec OC (8)	0–4	Saint-Colomban Sportive Locminé (5)
65.	Erdeven-Étel Foot (10)	0–4	FC Ploemeur (7)
66.	Moutons Blanc de Noyal-Pontivy (7)	3–0	US Goëlands de Larmor-Plage (8)
67.	Indépendante Mauronnaise (9)	0–1	La Guideloise (9)
68.	ES Colpo (10)	2–0	Espoir Saint-Jacut-les-Pins (8)
69.	Fondelienne Carentoir (9)	0–6	AS Ménimur (7)
70.	CS Josselin (8)	4–2	Languidic FC (7)
71.	AS Lanester (8)	2–0	Garde du Pont Marzan (8)
72.	Saint-Clair Réguiny (10)	0–4	CS Bignan (7)
73.	FC Locmariaquer-Saint-Philibert (9)	1–0	Enfants de Guer (7)
74.	ES Ploemel (8)	0–1	Keriolets de Pluvigner (6)
75.	Ecureils Roc-Saint-Andre (9)	4–2	FOLC Lorient Ouest (10)
76.	Montagnards Sulniac (9)	1–2	US Brech (8)
77.	Avenir Saint-Servant-sur-Oust (9)	1–1 (4–3 p)	Ajoncs d'Or Saint-Malguénac (9)
78.	Bogue D'Or Questembert (8)	0–6	US Montagnarde (6)
79.	Auray FC (6)	2–0	US La Gacilly (7)
80.	AS Vignoc-Hédé-Guipel (6)	1–0	AS Miniac-Morvan (7)
81.	FC Tinténiac-Saint-Domineuc (9)	0–2	US Billé-Javené (7)
82.	US Grégorienne (6)	3–4	FC Breteil-Talensac (6)
83.	AS La Gouesnière (8)	2–2 (3–4 p)	Cercle Jules Ferry Saint Malo (9)
84.	US Illet Forêt (8)	2–1	Fougères FC (9)
85.	US Château-Malo (8)	1–2	OC Montauban (7)
86.	US Liffré (6)	2–0	Cercle Paul Bert Bréquigny (7)
87.	FC Baie du Mont Saint-Michel (9)	1–1 (4–5 p)	CO Pacéen (7)
88.	FC La Mézière-Melesse (9)	0–0 (12–13 p)	SC Le Rheu (6)
89.	ASC Romagné (8)	3–0	Stade Saint-Aubinais (8)
90.	AS Jacques Cartier (8)	4–0 (Note: Tie reversed from original draw.)	ES Thorigné-Fouillard (8)
91.	Combourg SC (12)	0–0 (5–3 p)	SEP Quédillac (8)
92.	US Gaël Muel (9)	1–9	Fougères AGLD (5)
93.	US Janzé (8)	0–1	Domloup Sport (8)
94.	US Bourgbarré (9)	3–4	Espérance Chartres-de-Bretagne (6)
95.	US Tertre Gris (9)	0–0 (6–7 p)	FC La Chapelle-Montgermont (8)
96.	Olympic Montreuil-Landavran (9)	0–3	FC Guichen (6)
97.	AS Retiers-Coësmes (8)	1–3	TA Rennes (5)
98.	OC Cesson (6)	3–0	US Châteaugiron (7)
99.	La Vitréenne FC (7)	1–1 (4–3 p)	Eskouadenn de Brocéliande (7)
100.	CS Betton (8)	2–1	JA Pipriac (9)
101.	US Saint-Armel (10)	0–0 (3–4 p)	FC Guipry Messac (5)
102.	US Laillé (7)	0–3	AC Rennes (8)
103.	Cadets de Bains (7)	0–0 (7–8 p)	FC Atlantique Vilaine (6)
104.	RC Rannée-La Guerche-Drouges (7)	3–1 (Note: Match abandoned after Avenir Lieuron left the field, alleging racist remarks from the home supporters. RC Rannée-La Guerche-Drouges currently shown as qualifiying.)	Avenir Lieuron (8)

=== Fourth round ===
These matches were played on 2 and 3 October 2021.

Fourth round results: Brittany
Tie no	Home team (tier)	Score	Away team (tier)
1.	Paotred Rosko (10)	0–2	Stade Plabennécois (4)
2.	ES Colpo (10)	1–5	Keriolets de Pluvigner (6)
3.	FC La Chapelle-Montgermont (8)	0–2	AS Vitré (4)
4.	FC La Croix-Corlay (8)	0–1	Lannion FC (5)
5.	FC Meslan (10)	0–5	US Montagnarde (6)
6.	AS Trélivan (7)	0–1	TA Rennes (5)
7.	US Illet Forêt (8)	0–4	Fougères AGLD (5)
8.	PD Ergué-Gabéric (6)	2–1	AS Ginglin Cesson (6)
9.	US Quimperloise (9)	1–1 (2–4 p)	Auray FC (6)
10.	Stade Pontivyen (5)	0–2	GSI Pontivy (5)
11.	Plancoët-Arguenon FC (7)	3–0	AS Jacques Cartier (8)
12.	US Saint-Abraham Chapelle-Caro (9)	1–4	FC Pont-l'Abbé (7)
13.	FC Centre Bretagne (8)	0–1	US Liffré (6)
14.	Plouhinec FC (8)	1–2	Moutons Blanc de Noyal-Pontivy (7)
15.	US Brech (8)	2–1	FC Locmariaquer-Saint-Philibert (9)
16.	Elvinoise Foot (7)	0–7	Vannes OC (4)
17.	AS Ménimur (7)	8–0	US Saint-Melaine Rieux (8)
18.	La Guideloise (9)	0–3	Quimper Kerfeunteun FC (7)
19.	AS Lanester (8)	0–3	Saint-Colomban Sportive Locminé (5)
20.	ÉS Plogonnec (8)	1–4	US Moëlan (7)
21.	CS Josselin (8)	0–3	Ploërmel FC (6)
22.	RC Dinan (12)	0–4	SC Le Rheu (6)
23.	Combourg SC (12)	1–1 (5–4 p)	Espérance Chartres-de-Bretagne (6)
24.	Domloup Sport (8)	0–2	CS Betton (8)
25.	ES Penguily (8)	0–3	Stade Pleudihennais (7)
26.	OC Montauban (7)	6–2	US Billé-Javené (7)
27.	Les Vallées FC (9)	1–3	CS Plédran (8)
28.	FC Guipry Messac (5)	2–0	AS Vignoc-Hédé-Guipel (6)
29.	Cercle Jules Ferry Saint Malo (9)	0–1	CO Pacéen (7)
30.	AC Rennes (8)	0–6	US Saint-Malo (4)
31.	ASC Romagné (8)	0–1	FC Breteil-Talensac (6)
32.	CO Briochin Sportif Ploufraganais (7)	2–0	La Vitréenne FC (7)
33.	Amicale Italia Bretagne (7)	0–2	Lorient Sports (7)
34.	AS Brest (8)	4–0	Châteaulin FC (6)
35.	Amicale Ergué-Gabéric (8)	1–4	Stade Paimpolais FC (6)
36.	AS Plestinaise (9)	1–2	Vie au Grand Air Bohars (7)
37.	AL Coataudon (8)	2–2 (5–4 p)	Plaintel SF (7)
38.	FA de la Rade (10)	0–1	RC Ploumagoar (7)
39.	Gars de Saint-Yves (7)	– (Note: Match abandoned by the referee just before half-time, with US Goudelin leading 1–0, when their captain refused to leave the field after being sent off. US Goudelin penalised, Gars de Saint-Yves qualify.)	US Goudelin (7)
40.	ASPTT Brest (7)	1–2	US Trégunc (5)
41.	FC Gouesnou (7)	0–0 (5–3 p)	SC Morlaix (7)
42.	Arzelliz Ploudalmézeau (9)	1–0	FC Lampaulais (9)
43.	Goulien Sports (9)	0–5	Lamballe FC (6)
44.	Espérance Plouguerneau (7)	4–3	Dernières Cartouches Carhaix (8)
45.	FC Lanhouarneau-Plounévez-Lochrist (9)	0–4	Landerneau FC (6)
46.	US Trieux-Lézardrieux-Pleudaniel (9)	0–3	US Perros-Louannec (7)
47.	AG Plouvorn (7)	2–1	CS Bégard (6)
48.	ES Mignonne (9)	1–2	Saint-Pierre de Milizac (5)
49.	Muzillac OS (8)	5–2	FC Ploemeur (7)
50.	Ecureils Roc-Saint-Andre (9)	1–2	CS Bignan (7)
51.	La Plozévetienne (8)	2–1	EA Scaër (7)
52.	FC Guichen (6)	1–4	Dinan-Léhon FC (5)
53.	Avenir Saint-Servant-sur-Oust (9)	1–5	FC Atlantique Vilaine (6)
54.	RC Rannée-La Guerche-Drouges (7)	0–2	OC Cesson (6)

=== Fifth round ===
These matches were played on 16 and 17 October 2021.

Fifth round results: Brittany
Tie no	Home team (tier)	Score	Away team (tier)
1.	Gars de Saint-Yves (7)	1–1 (4–2 p)	FC Gouesnou (7)
2.	AS Brest (8)	2–6	US Concarneau (3)
3.	AG Plouvorn (7)	2–1	Saint-Colomban Sportive Locminé (5)
4.	Lorient Sports (7)	1–1 (4–3 p)	US Moëlan (7)
5.	Stade Paimpolais FC (6)	3–3 (3–4 p)	Keriolets de Pluvigner (6)
6.	RC Ploumagoar (7)	0–0 (5–6 p)	Vannes OC (4)
7.	GSI Pontivy (5)	0–0 (5–4 p)	Landerneau FC (6)
8.	Quimper Kerfeunteun FC (7)	3–3 (1–3 p)	US Trégunc (5)
9.	Espérance Plouguerneau (7)	0–4	Lannion FC (5)
10.	Arzelliz Ploudalmézeau (9)	2–1	FC Pont-l'Abbé (7)
11.	US Perros-Louannec (7)	0–0 (6–5 p)	AL Coataudon (8)
12.	Vie au Grand Air Bohars (7)	1–1 (5–3 p)	La Plozévetienne (8)
13.	US Montagnarde (6)	0–1	Stade Plabennécois (4)
14.	Saint-Pierre de Milizac (5)	1–2	PD Ergué-Gabéric (6)
15.	Combourg SC (11)	0–1	Plancoët-Arguenon FC (7)
16.	CS Bignan (7)	0–3	US Saint-Malo (4)
17.	FC Atlantique Vilaine (6)	0–4	Stade Briochin (3)
18.	CS Plédran (8)	2–1	Muzillac OS (8)
19.	Lamballe FC (6)	0–1	Fougères AGLD (5)
20.	Ploërmel FC (6)	4–0	CO Pacéen (7)
21.	TA Rennes (5)	1–2	AS Vitré (4)
22.	CS Betton (8)	0–5	US Liffré (6)
23.	Auray FC (6)	0–0 (5–4 p)	OC Montauban (7)
24.	Stade Pleudihennais (7)	5–1	CO Briochin Sportif Ploufraganais (7)
25.	Moutons Blanc de Noyal-Pontivy (7)	0–3	Dinan-Léhon FC (5)
26.	FC Breteil-Talensac (6)	2–0	AS Ménimur (7)
27.	OC Cesson (6)	6–1	SC Le Rheu (6)
28.	US Brech (8)	0–2	FC Guipry Messac (5)

=== Sixth round ===
These matches were played on 30 and 31 October 2021.

Sixth round results: Brittany
Tie no	Home team (tier)	Score	Away team (tier)
1.	Dinan-Léhon FC (5)	6–1	Ploërmel FC (6)
2.	AS Vitré (4)	0–0 (7–6 p)	GSI Pontivy (5)
3.	Lorient Sports (7)	0–1	CS Plédran (8)
4.	Keriolets de Pluvigner (6)	0–2	US Liffré (6)
5.	Plancoët-Arguenon FC (7)	3–0	Stade Pleudihennais (7)
6.	Arzelliz Ploudalmézeau (9)	0–7	US Saint-Malo (4)
7.	US Concarneau (3)	1–1 (3–4 p)	Stade Briochin (3)
8.	Lannion FC (5)	3–1	OC Cesson (6)
9.	FC Breteil-Talensac (6)	1–1 (2–4 p)	Vannes OC (4)
10.	US Perros-Louannec (7)	2–1	FC Guipry Messac (5)
11.	Auray FC (6)	0–1	Stade Plabennécois (4)
12.	AG Plouvorn (7)	0–2	Fougères AGLD (5)
13.	PD Ergué-Gabéric (6)	4–1	Vie au Grand Air Bohars (7)
14.	Gars de Saint-Yves (7)	2–2 (5–6 p)	US Trégunc (5)
