= Kévin Bodin =

French footballer (born 1987)

Personal information
- Date of birth: March 30, 1987 (age 39)
- Place of birth: Quimperlé, France
- Height: 1.78 m (5 ft 10 in)
- Position: Left-back

Team information
- Current team: Trébeurden-Pleumeur (player-coach)

Youth career
- 2001–2002: CP Ploufragan
- 2002–2004: Guingamp

Senior career*
Years	Team	Apps	(Gls)
2006–2010	Guingamp	18	(0)
2010–2011	Lannion	19	(4)
2011–2012	Carquefou	32	(1)
2012–2020	Lannion	91	(14)
2020–	Trébeurden-Pleumeur		

Managerial career
- 2020–: Trébeurden-Pleumeur (player-coach)
- * Club domestic league appearances and goals

Kévin Bodin (born March 30, 1987) is a French professional footballer, who currently coaches and plays for FC Trébeurden-Pleumeur Bodou.

== Career ==
He began his career in 2001 for the Centre De Préformation De Ploufragan and moved 2002 to the youth side from En Avant de Guingamp. In the season 2006/2007 was promoted to the Ligue 2 team of En Avant de Guingamp. After eight years on senior and youth side for EA Guingamp signed on 11 November 2010 for Lannion FC.
