= Lannion FC =

French football club

- Full name: Lannion Football Club
- Founded: 2000
- Ground: Stade René Guillou, Lannion
- Capacity: 1,500
- Chairman: Philippe Cousyn
- Manager: Maxime D'Ornano
- League: Régional 1
- 2024–25: National 3 Group C, 11th of 14 (Relegated)
Home colours

Lannion Football Club (Breton: Lannuon; commonly referred to as simply Lannion) is a French football club based in Lannion in the Brittany region. The club was founded in 2000 and currently plays in the Régional 1, the sixth division of French football.

== Current squad ==
As of 25 February 2019

Note: Flags indicate national team as defined under FIFA eligibility rules; some limited exceptions apply. Players may hold more than one non-FIFA nationality.

No.	Pos.	Nation	Player
—	GK	(France) FRA	Anthony Toulouzan
—	GK	(France) FRA	Corentin Lesur
—	GK	(France) FRA	Florian Piolot
—	DF	(France) FRA	Kévin Bodin
—	DF	(France) FRA	Baptiste Poncel
—	DF	(France) FRA	Gwenvaël Hamel
—	DF	(France) FRA	Thibault Le Danvezet
—	DF	(France) FRA	Ferdinand Makaya
—	DF	(France) FRA	Antoine Guiziou
—	DF	(France) FRA	Clément Briard
—	DF	(France) FRA	Florian Kerger
—	MF	(France) FRA	Norbert Gomis

No.	Pos.	Nation	Player
—	MF	(France) FRA	Briac Lecue
—	MF	(France) FRA	Hugo Nicolas
—	MF	(France) FRA	Axel Appery
—	MF	(France) FRA	Yohann Guillaumin
—	MF	(France) FRA	Kirane Gracien
—	MF	(France) FRA	Nicolas Irien
—	FW	(France) FRA	Tom Jan
—	FW	(France) FRA	Daouda N'Gom
—	FW	(French Polynesia) TAH	Abdelkader Lazreg
—	FW	(France) FRA	Corentin Le Houerou
—	MF	(France) FRA	Valentin Gouault
