= 2017–18 Coupe de France preliminary rounds, Bretagne =

French football competition

The 2017–18 Coupe de France preliminary rounds, Bretagne make up the qualifying football competition to decide which teams from the French Bretagne region take part in the main competition from the seventh round.

== First round ==
The matches in Bretagne were played 18 and 20 August 2017.

First round results: Bretagne

Tie no	Home team (tier)	Score	Away team (tier)
1.	AS Broons-Trémeur (9)	6–0	US Plumaugat (10)
2.	US St Armel-Le Hézo (11)	0–4	ES Mériadec (10)
3.	AS Trédrez-Locquémeau (12)	2–2 (5–4 p)	US Perros-Louannec (8)
4.	Stade Kénanais (11)	2–5	US Pays Rochois (9)
5.	FC Lizildry (11)	0–4	Écureuils de Plourivo (9)
6.	JA Penvénan (9)	0–2	ES Ploubazlanec (8)
7.	US Pluzunet-Tonquédec (10)	1–5	RC Ploumagoar (8)
8.	BO Caouennec-Lanvézéac (12)	0–4	FC Trélévern-Trévou (9)
9.	US Kerity (10)	0–3	AS Pleubian-Pleumeur (8)
10.	CS Rospez (10)	2–4	Trégor FC (8)
11.	AS Ploumilliau (9)	1–0	US Plouisy (8)
12.	US Prat (10)	1–2	AS Servel-Lannion (8)
13.	ES Plougrasienne (11)	0–1	UO Trégor (10)
14.	Méné Bré Sports Pédernec (10)	1–3	Goëlo FC (8)
15.	US Trémel (10)	0–3	JS Cavan (8)
16.	Pléhédel Sports (11)	1–2	US Goudelin (9)
17.	US Méné Bré Louargat (10)	0–3	US Briacine (9)
18.	AS Plenaltais (10)	2–4	AS Trémuson (8)
19.	AS La Montagne (11)	0–4	US Argoat-Pélem (9)
20.	AS Celtic de l'Hyères (11)	2–8	US Callac (9)
21.	ES Pestivien (11)	1–2	US Maël-Carhaix (9)
22.	FC Poulancre-Múr-St Gilles (10)	0–2	Plounévez-Lanrivain-Trémargat US (9)
23.	US Plouguernével (10)	4–0	Trieux FC (10)
24.	AS Motreff (10)	0–2	AC Carhaix (9)
25.	AS Plussulien (11)	1–2	US Glomel (10)
26.	AS Blavet (10)	1–2	FC La Croix-Corlay (9)
27.	AS Kérien-Magoar (10)	1–1 (4–1 p)	Étoile du Leff Boqueho (10)
28.	US St Donan (10)	0–4	FC Plouagat-Châtelaudren-Lanrodec (9)
29.	Union Squiffiec-Trégonneau (10)	1–0	Entente du Trieux FC (8)
30.	FC Le Vieux Bourg (10)	0–6	ASL St Julien (8)
31.	ES Le Fœil (10)	5–1	ES Trégomeuroise (9)
32.	US St Caradec (10)	1–7	St Brandan-Quintin FC (8)
33.	JS Allineuc (11)	1–2	AS Trévé Sports (10)
34.	AS Plélo (9)	3–3 (5–4 p)	AS St Herve (8)
35.	AS La Prenessaye (10)	0–1	FC St Bugan (9)
36.	US Mené Le Gouray (11)	0–7	AS Motterieux (9)
37.	Étoile Sud Armor Porhoët(9)	2–3 (a.e.t.)	CS Merdrignac (8)
38.	CS Illifaut (10)	0–3	Laurmené FC (9)
39.	US Plouasne-St Juvat (10)	2–2 (4–3 p)	US Trémorel (9)
40.	AS Pyramide Lanfains (11)	1–3	AFC La Harmoye-St Martin-des-Prés (10)
41.	FC Moncontour-Trédaniel (9)	1–3	Évron FC (8)
42.	AS Plumaudan (10)	0–2	Stade Évrannais (9)
43.	ALSL Plémy (10)	1–4 (a.e.t.)	FC Lié (9)
44.	La Plœucoise Foot (10)	2–2 (4–2 p)	ES Penguily (8)
45.	FC Trévron (10)	0–3	CS Lanrelas (9)
46.	US Lanvallay (10)	0–3	AS Trélivan (8)
47.	ES St Cast-le-Guildo (10)	2–1	Val d'Arguenon Créhen-Pluduno (9)
48.	JS Landéhen (10)	6–5 (a.e.t.)	FC Pays de Plélan Vildé (9)
49.	FC Côte de Penthièvre (10)	2–3	ES Hénansal-St Denoual-La Bouillie Emeraude (9)
50.	AS Trébry (10)	0–8	US Brusvily (9)
51.	UF Yffiniac (10)	2–1	Coëtmieux Pommeret FC (9)
52.	St Thois Sports (11)	1–3	US Châteauneuf-du-Faou (10)
53.	US Brasparts-Loqueffret (11)	0–5	AS Pont-de-Buis (10)
54.	CS Croix Lambert (10)	1–4	AS Trégueux (8)
55.	AS Dinéault (11)	0–4	Racing Cast-Porzay (10)
56.	US Quéménéven (11)	0–2	St Nic Sports (10)
57.	Lopérec Sport (10)	2–4	Gas du Menez-Hom (9)
58.	US Landeleau (9)	0–6	Dernières Cartouches Carhaix (8)
59.	ES Cranou (10)	3–2	AS Telgruc-sur-Mer (9)
60.	ES Gouézec (10)	0–2	Stade Pleybennois (9)
61.	Kerlaz Sport (10)	2–4	US Crozon-Morgat (10)
62.	Lanvéoc Sports (10)	3–1	AS Camaretoise (9)
63.	Plouyé Magic United (12)	2–1	US St Hernin (11)
64.	US Kergloff (10)	1–3	Toros Plounévézel (9)
65.	Gars de Plonévez-du-Faou (10)	1–3	US Poullaouen (9)
66.	PB Spézet (9)	2–1	Gourin FC (8)
67.	Ecureils de Roudouallec (10)	1–2	AS Gâs de Leuhan (10)
68.	AS St Barnabé (11)	1–1 (5–4 p)	Vigilante Plémet (10)
69.	AS St Vougay (10)	1–5	ES Plounéventer (9)
70.	Fleur de Genêt Bannalec (9)	0–7	EA Scaër (8)
71.	US Lennon (10)	0–3	US Cléden-Poher (10)
72.	US St Thurien (12)	2–6	Coquelicots du Trévoux (11)
73.	Stade Mellacois (9)	1–1 (3–4 p)	US Quimperlé (8)
74.	FC Aven-Bélon (10)	5–6	Hermine Concarnoise (9)
75.	US Quimperoise (9)	2–1	Edern Sports (9)
76.	AS Baye (9)	1–0 (a.e.t.)	US Clohars-Carnoët (8)
77.	ES Rédené (10)	3–1	US Querrien (10)
78.	AS Kernével (10)	1–6	ES Névez (10)
79.	Locunolé Sports (10)	2–0	AS Tréméven (10)
80.	AS St Yvi (9)	0–1	AS Melgven (8)
81.	ES Langolen (9)	1–3	Glaziks de Coray (8)
82.	Zèbres de Trégourez (10)	1–4	Paotred Briec (9)
83.	FC Rosporden (9)	2–0	US St Évarzec (9)
84.	Tricolores Landrévarzec (10)	1–2	FC Quimper Penhars (9)
85.	FC Pleuvennois (9)	0–0 (8–7 p)	FC Odet (8)
86.	Lapins de Guengat (11)	1–3	AS Diables du Juch (10)
87.	Standard Plomelin (11)	2–2 (5–6 p)	Combrit Ste Marine FC (10)
88.	US Pluguffan (9)	0–4	Quimper Ergué-Armel FC (8)
89.	FC Treffiagat-Guilvinec (9)	0–4	AS Plomelin (8)
90.	AS Loctudy (11)	2–4	Gars de Plomeur (10)
91.	US Portugais Quimper (10)	4–3	Marcassins Sportif Tréogat (10)
92.	US Sens-de-Bretagne (11)	1–6	JA St Servan (9)
93.	CA Forestois (10)	1–4	La Raquette Tréméoc (10)
94.	US Île-Tudy (10)	2–5	FC Bigouden (10)
95.	FC Penn-ar-Bed (10)	4–0	Goulien Sports (11)
96.	JS Plogastel (9)	1–1 (4–2 p)	AS Plouhinécoise (8)
97.	Gourlizon Sport (9)	4–3 (a.e.t.)	Plonéour FC (8)
98.	ES Beuzec (10)	2–1	ES Malahon-Confort (9)
99.	Gas d'Ys Tréboul (10)	1–2	ES Plogonnec (9)
100.	FC Goyen (10)	3–1	AS Gars de Poullan (10)
101.	ES Plonéis (10)	2–0	ES Landudec-Guiler (10)
102.	Mélénicks Elliant (9)	1–0	Amicale Ergué-Gabéric (8)
103.	La Guerlesquinaise (10)	2–2 (3–5 p)	FC Plouezoc'h (9)
104.	ES Carantec-Henvic (9)	3–1	Étoile Trégoroise Plougasnou (10)
105.	Gars de la Rive (10)	0–5	AS Scrignac (8)
106.	US Plouigneau (10)	4–2 (a.e.t.)	Stade Léonard Kreisker (11)
107.	Avenir Plourin (10)	2–3	US Lanmeur-Plouégat-Guérand (9)
108.	Paotred Rosko (9)	0–5	FC Lanhouarneau-Plounévez-Lochrist (8)
109.	Hermine Kernilis (10)	1–7	Espérance Plouguerneau (8)
110.	FC Ste Sève (10)	1–5	ES St Thégonnec (8)
111.	Gars de Plouénan (10)	1–6	AS Santec (8)
112.	US Taulé (9)	2–5 (a.e.t.)	Guiclan FC (8)
113.	Cadets de Plougoulm (11)	0–3	EF Plougourvest (9)
114.	US Pont-Meur Guimiliau (10)	6–1	ES Lampaulaise (10)
115.	ES Tréflez (11)	0–5	Gâs de Plouider (10)
116.	FC Côte des Légendes (10)	1–1 (1–4 p)	St Pierre Plouescat (9)
117.	US St Servais-St Derrien (11)	0–8	AS Berven-Plouzévédé (9)
118.	ES Guissény (10)	3–0	AS Kersaint (10)
119.	US Rochoise (10)	0–6	CND Le Folgoët (8)
120.	FC Le Drennec (11)	0–3	AS Landeda (9)
121.	US Pencran (10)	0–6	FC Le Relecq-Kerhuon (8)
122.	ES Mignonne (10)	1–2 (a.e.t.)	AS Sizun-Le Tréhou (9)
123.	AS Dirinon (9)	3–1	FA de la Rade (8)
124.	US Aber-Benoît Tréglonou (10)	2–3 (a.e.t.)	SC Lannilis (8)
125.	Étoile St Arzel (9)	1–7	ES Portsall Kersaint (8)
126.	ES Berrien-Huelgoat (10)	1–0	ES Pleyber-Christ (9)
127.	AS Plouvien (8)	2–1	Avel Vor St Pabu (10)
128.	SC Lanrivoaré (10)	2–0	Gars St Majan (11)
129.	AS Ploumoguer (10)	0–1	ASPTT Brest (8)
130.	Cavale Blanche (10)	3–6	US Plougonvelin (8)
131.	US St Roch (11)	0–3	Arzelliz Ploudalmézeau (9)
132.	ES Locmaria-Plouzané (9)	0–2	AS Guilers (8)
133.	JS St Thonanaise (10)	2–2 (6–5 p)	PL Bergot (9)
134.	St Divy Sports (9)	0–2	Légion St Pierre (8)
135.	JG Forestoise (10)	2–3 (a.e.t.)	Étoile St Edern (9)
136.	Rance Coëtquen Football (10)	0–2	Stade Pleudihennais (8)
137.	FC Meillac-Lanhélin-Bonnemain (9)	0–1	AS Jacques Cartier (8)
138.	JS Picanaise (10)	1–3	La Cancalaise (8)
139.	La Mélorienne (10)	3–0	AS St Pierraise Épiniac (9)
140.	Omnisport Suliaçais (11)	2–3	FC Sougéal (10)
141.	AS St Coulomb (10)	1–5	Pleurtuit Côte d'Emeraude (10)
142.	ES Québriac (12)	0–3	FC Linon (11)
143.	US Château-Malo (8)	5–2	US St Guinoux (11)
144.	FC Bord de Rance (10)	3–6 (a.e.t.)	AS La Gouesnière (9)
145.	FC Tinténiac-St Domineuc (10)	5–1	US Baguer-Morvan (9)
146.	Entente Sens-Vieux-Vy Gahard (11)	1–8	US Gosné (9)
147.	FC Louvigné-La Bazouge (9)	5–5 (0–2 p)	AS Miniac-Morvan (8)
148.	FC Baie du Mont St Michel (9)	3–0	US Illet Forêt (9)
149.	FC Plerguer/Roz-Landrieux (10)	1–2	Cercle Jules Ferry (8)
150.	Indépendante St Georges-de-Chesné (9)	2–1	ES St Germain/Montours (8)
151.	FC Marcillé-Bazouges-St Remy-Noyal (10)	4–0	FC Sud Fougerais (9)
152.	FC Des Landes (10)	0–13	ASC Romagné (8)
153.	US St Marc/St Ouen (10)	3–4	FC Stéphanais Briçois (9)
154.	AJS Mayotte Fougères (12)	3–1	Entente Parigné/Landéan (11)
155.	ASE Lécousse (9)	0–6	Stade St Aubinais (8)
156.	AC Couesnon (12)	1–13	US Billé-Javené (9)
157.	FC Chapelle-Cintré (11)	1–0	AS Romille (10)
158.	Association Châtillon-en-Vendelais-Princé (10)	0–1 (a.e.t.)	La Chapelle-Fleurigné-Laignelet-Le Loroux (8)
159.	Fougères FC (11)	1–5	Espérance La Bouëxière (10)
160.	US St Gilles (9)	3–0	FC Aubinois (8)
161.	US Bédée-Pleumeleuc (9)	2–1	US Acigné (8)
162.	ASPTT Rennes (9)	0–3	US Gévezé (8)
163.	AS Parthenay-de-Bretagne (11)	0–3	AS Ercé-près-Liffré (11)
164.	US Médréac (10)	3–2 (a.e.t.)	FC La Mézière-Melesse (9)
165.	SEP Quédillac (9)	5–0	Cercle Paul Bert Gayeulles (9)
166.	FC Beauregard Rennes (10)	2–1	Avenir Irodouër (11)
167.	JA Bréal (9)	1–4 (a.e.t.)	US St Méen-St Onen (8)
168.	US Langoelan (10)	3–4	ES Neulliac (10)
169.	AS St Jacques (11)	1–2	Hermitage AC (8)
170.	US Le Crouais (11)	1–3	USC Chavagne (9)
171.	ES St Aubin-des Landes/EF Cornillé (10)	1–3	Ossé/St Aubin (9)
172.	AS Montreuil-le-Gast (12)	1–0	US Dourdain (10)
173.	US Gaël Muel (8)	4–0	FC Mosaïque (9)
174.	US Pont-Péan (9)	3–0	OC Brétillien (11)
175.	FC Baulon-Lassy (10)	0–1	US Bel Air (9)
176.	SC Goven (10)	1–7	US Janzé (8)
177.	US Guignen (9)	1–3 (a.e.t.)	US Bain (8)
178.	US Bais (11)	1–7	US Bourgbarré (9)
179.	JA Pipriac (10)	0–2	US Ste Marie (11)
180.	SC St Senoux (10)	2–3	US Châteaugiron (8)
181.	ASC St Erblon (10)	2–7	Domloup Sport (8)
182.	JS Nouvoitou (10)	2–0	Reveil Seglinois (12)
183.	Espérance Sixt-sur-Aff (10)	0–4	US Laillé (8)
184.	ES Boistrudan-Piré (10)	2–3 (a.e.t.)	US Noyal-Chatillon (9)
185.	Bleuets Le Pertre-Brielles-Gennes-St Cyr (9)	0–2	US Val d'Izé (8)
186.	US Les Brulais-Comblessac (11)	2–4 (a.e.t.)	Hermine de Renac (12)
187.	US La Bosse-Saulnières (10)	1–6	US Vern-sur-Seiche (9)
188.	US Erbrée-Mondevert (10)	2–4	Châteaubourg-St Melanie FA (9)
189.	Montfort-Iffendic (10)	1–0	Breizh Fobal Klub (11)
190.	Olympic Montreuil-Landavran (10)	0–1	US Domagné-St Didier (9)
191.	Châteaubourg FC (10)	0–1	JA Balazé (8)
192.	AS Étrelles (10)	0–3	Stade Louvignéen (8)
193.	Avenir Lieuron (9)	4–4 (4–5 p)	Espérance de Rennes (8)
194.	US Chapelloise (11)	1–3	FC Pays d'Anast (9)
195.	Torcé-Vergéal FC (10)	3–2	Haute Vilaine FC (10)
196.	FC Meslan (10)	1–2	JA Arzano (9)
197.	AS Bubry (9)	0–2 (a.e.t.)	US Berné (10)
198.	FL Inguiniel (10)	1–5	Avenir Guiscriff (9)
199.	AS Le Tour-de-Parc (11)	1–2	Damgan-Ambon Sport (9)
200.	La Guideloise (8)	8–0	US Nostang (9)
201.	Stiren Cléguer FC (10)	5–0	US Lanvénégen (11)
202.	FC Kerzec (9)	1–1 (3–4 p)	Caudan SF (8)
203.	AS Lanvaudan (10)	0–10	AS Gestel (9)
204.	US Bécherel/Minias-sous-Bécherel (10)	0–8	US Mordelles (8)
205.	ES Le Croisty-St Caradec (10)	1–3	SC Sournais (10)
206.	AS Priziac (10)	8–0	ES Ségliennaise (11)
207.	Stade Guémenois (10)	2–2 (4–2 p)	Melrand Sports (10)
208.	Bleuets Crédin (10)	1–1 (6–5 p)	St Hubert Sport Lanouée (11)
209.	US Le Faouët (9)	2–1 (a.e.t.)	FC Kerchopine (10)
210.	FC Klegereg (9)	3–2	FC Gueltas-St Gérand-St Gonnery (10)
211.	Ajoncs d'Or Malguénac (10)	3–2	St Clair Réguiny (10)
212.	CS Pluméliau (8)	4–1	ACS Bieuzy-les-Eaux (9)
213.	Espérance Bréhan (8)	5–0	Garde St Eloi Kerfourn (9)
214.	Cadets de Guéhenno (11)	1–2	Avenir Buléon-Lantillac (10)
215.	St Pierre Pleugriffet (9)	0–1	Vigilante Radenac (10)
216.	Aurore de Taupont (9)	1–0	Espoir de l'Oust Les Fougerêts (10)
217.	US Rohannaise (10)	6–1	Entente Mohon/St Malo-des-Trois-Fontaines (11)
218.	CS Josselin (9)	3–1	Garde de l'Yvel Loyat (10)
219.	AS Croix-Helléan (10)	0–2 (a.e.t.)	Enfants de St Gildas (8)
220.	Garde de la Mi-Voie (11)	0–1	St Jean Sport (9)
221.	Volontaires d'Augan (10)	2–5	Indépendante Mauronnaise (8)
222.	Bleuets Néant-sur-Yvel (10)	0–1	JA Pleucadeuc (10)
223.	Avenir St Servant-sur-Oust (8)	3–3 (3–2 p)	Ecureils Roc-St André (9)
224.	Brocéliande Campénéac (9)	2–0	JA Peillac (10)
225.	Ruffiac-Malestroit (8)	5–2 (a.e.t.)	La Sérentaise (9)
226.	Enfants de Guer (8)	1–0	Étoile de l'Oust St Congard-St Laurent (9)
227.	FC Cournon (11)	0–5	Espoir St Jacut-les-Pins (9)
228.	Fondelienne Carentoir (9)	1–0	Étoile St Martin (10)
229.	US St Abraham Chapelle-Caro (8)	0–1	Caro/Missiriac AS (9)
230.	FC St Perreux (9)	5–2	US Le Cours (10)
231.	FC Basse Vilaine (9)	6–1	AS Turcs de l'Ouest (10)
232.	St Sébastien Caden (9)	3–0	AG Arzal (10)
233.	Armoricaine Péaule (9)	1–0	ES Trinitaine (10)
234.	Avenir St Vincent-sur-Oust (10)	0–3	AS Berrich-Lauzach (10)
235.	Chevaliers St Maurice St Guyomard (10)	0–3	Montagnards Sulniac (9)
236.	Rah-Koëd Plaudren FC (10)	1–2	Garde du Loch (9)
237.	JF Noyal-Muzillac (9)	2–0	Gentienne Pluherlin (10)
238.	AS St Eloi La Vraie-Croix (8)	4–2	ES Larré-Molac (9)
239.	Ajoncs d'Or St Nolff (9)	4–0	ACS Outre Mer Vannes (10)
240.	Garde du Pont Marzan (8)	2–3	US St Melaine Rieux (9)
241.	CS St Gaudence Allaire (10)	2–1	La Patriote Malansac (11)
242.	US Arradon (8)	2–0	ES Crac'h (9)
243.	Sarzeau FC (9)	14–1	Prat Poulfanc Sport-Vannes Sété (10)
244.	Plumelin Sports (8)	1–2	EFC St Jean Brévelay (9)
245.	AS Meucon (9)	0–6	AS Monterblanc (11)
246.	ES Plescop (8)	2–1	AS Plougoumelen-Bono (9)
247.	AS Brévelaise (10)	0–6	ES Colpo (11)
248.	Landaul Sports (8)	2–0	Stade Landévantais (9)
249.	Avenir Plumergat (10)	0–2	ASC Ste Anne-d'Auray (11)
250.	AS Belle-Île-en-Mer (9)	0–0 (4–5 p)	Carnac FC (10)
251.	Semeurs de Grand-Champ (8)	1–0	AS Pluvignoise (9)
252.	AL Camors (10)	2–5	Guénin Sport (8)
253.	ES Ploemel (8)	5–2	US Brech (9)
254.	CS Pluneret (10)	4–0	US Bieuzy-Lanvaux (10)
255.	Riantec OC (9)	5–0	Stade Gâvrais (10)
256.	US Ploeren (10)	1–1 (4–2 p)	FC Locmariaquer-St Philibert (10)
257.	Avenir Ste Hélène (10)	1–2	Lanester FC (10)
258.	Plouhinec FC (9)	3–2	Erdeven-Étel (10)
259.	La Locminoise (11)	2–4	Garde du Gohazé St Thuriau (10)
260.	St Efflam Kervignac (9)	4–2	Entente St Gilloise (10)
261.	Languidic FC (8)	7–1	Fleur d'Ajonc Inzinzac (9)
262.	Garde Ste Anne Branderion (10)	1–1 (4–1 p)	Stade Hennebontais (11)
263.	Avenir de Guilliers (11)	1–3 (a.e.t.)	Mélécienne de Plumelec (10)
264.	AS Moustoir-Ac (10)	1–0	AS Kergonan (10)
265.	Les Vallées FC (10)	1–4	AS Bobital (10)
266.	Hermine Locoal-Mendon (10)	0–7	AS Lanester (8)
267.	AS Calanaise (10)	0–2	VFL Keryado (10)
268.	ES Remungol (10)	1–3 (a.e.t.)	AS Penquesten (10)
269.	AS Guermeur (10)	0–9	CS Quéven (8)
270.	FC Morieux (10)	1–3	US Hunaudaye (9)
271.	US St Carreuc-Hénon (9)	3–2	AS Hillion-St René (8)
272.	AL Coataudon (9)	1–5	Stade Landernéen Kergrèis (9)

== Second round ==
These matches were played on 26 and 27 August 2017.

Second round results: Bretagne

Tie no	Home team (tier)	Score	Away team (tier)
1.	ES Plogonnec (9)	4–1	Racing Cast-Porzay (10)
2.	FC Tinténiac-St Domineuc (10)	1–2	Cercle Jules Ferry (8)
3.	US Crozon-Morgat (10)	0–6	Dernières Cartouches Carhaix (8)
4.	Paotred Briec (9)	1–1 (4–3 p)	Châteaulin FC (7)
5.	Plouyé Magic United (12)	0–1	AS Gâs de Leuhan (10)
6.	Stade Pleybennois (9)	2–3	US Cléden-Poher (10)
7.	AC Carhaix (9)	3–1	US Châteauneuf-du-Faou (10)
8.	AS Pont-de-Buis (10)	0–4	Stella Maris Douarnenez (7)
9.	US Poullaouen (9)	0–0 (4–2 p)	Lanvéoc Sports (10)
10.	St Nic Sports (10)	0–1	PB Spézet (9)
11.	AS Melgven (8)	2–0	Mélénicks Elliant (9)
12.	Toros Plounévézel (9)	2–4	Quimper Italia FC (7)
13.	ES Névez (10)	1–7	EA Scaër (8)
14.	Coquelicots du Trévoux (11)	0–8	Hermine Concarnoise (9)
15.	Locunolé Sports (10)	0–8	Quimper Kerfeunteun FC (8)
16.	US Portugais Quimper (10)	0–1	US Fouesnant (7)
17.	Glaziks de Coray (8)	4–1	AS Baye (9)
18.	FC Pleuvennois (9)	0–4	FC Quimperlois (7)
19.	Combrit Ste Marine FC (10)	3–2	FC Quimper Penhars (9)
20.	FC Rosporden (9)	2–2 (2–4 p)	US Moëlan (7)
21.	US Quimperlé (8)	0–3	US Quimperoise (9)
22.	ES Rédené (10)	2–3 (a.e.t.)	Quimper Ergué-Armel FC (8)
23.	ES Plonéis (10)	0–10	AS Plomelin (8)
24.	US Plouigneau (10)	2–4	FC Lanhouarneau-Plounévez-Lochrist (8)
25.	AS Diables du Juch (10)	1–4	La Plozévetienne (7)
26.	ES Beuzec (10)	1–5	Gourlizon Sport (9)
27.	FC Bigouden (10)	1–9	FC Pont-l'Abbé (8)
28.	FC Goyen (10)	1–2	JS Plogastel (9)
29.	La Raquette Tréméoc (10)	0–2	Gas du Menez-Hom (9)
30.	Gars de Plomeur (10)	0–4	Cormorans Sportif de Penmarc'h (7)
31.	ES Carantec-Henvic (9)	2–1	US Pont-Meur Guimiliau (10)
32.	ES St Thégonnec (8)	8–0	FC Plouezoc'h (9)
33.	St Pierre Plouescat (9)	4–1	ES Berrien-Huelgoat (10)
34.	Guiclan FC (8)	2–3	AS Scrignac (8)
35.	AS St Martin-des-Champs (7)	2–4	US Cléder (7)
36.	JU Plougonven (8)	0–5	AG Plouvorn (7)
37.	Gâs de Plouider (10)	2–4	CND Le Folgoët (8)
38.	AS Berven-Plouzévédé (9)	0–1	SC Morlaix (7)
39.	AS Santec (8)	4–1	US Lanmeur-Plouégat-Guérand (9)
40.	AS Sizun-Le Tréhou (9)	1–4	RC Lesnevien (7)
41.	Étoile St Yves Ploudaniel (7)	2–4	AS Plouvien (8)
42.	JS St Thonanaise (10)	0–2	Bodilis-Plougar FC (7)
43.	Plougastel FC (8)	2–4	Landi FC (7)
44.	EF Plougourvest (9)	1–0	ES Cranou (10)
45.	ES Plounéventer (9)	2–1 (a.e.t.)	FC Gouesnou (8)
46.	FC Penn-ar-Bed (10)	1–6	AS Plobannalec-Lesconil (7)
47.	Stade Landernéen Kergrèis (9)	1–4	FC Le Relecq-Kerhuon (8)
48.	ES Guissény (10)	1–2	Espérance Plouguerneau (8)
49.	SC Lannilis (8)	1–0	AS Brest (7)
50.	St Pierre Milizac (7)	1–0	Vie au Grand Air Bohars (7)
51.	FC Trélévern-Trévou (9)	2–2 (5–4 p)	Trégor FC (8)
52.	SC Lanrivoaré (10)	0–2	ES Portsall Kersaint (8)
53.	Légion St Pierre (8)	0–3	US Plougonvelin (8)
54.	Gars de St Yves (7)	1–2	Étoile St Laurent (8)
55.	ASPTT Brest (8)	5–2	Arzelliz Ploudalmézeau (9)
56.	AS Guilers (8)	1–0	Étoile St Edern (9)
57.	AS Landeda (9)	1–3	AS Dirinon (9)
58.	AS Pleubian-Pleumeur (8)	2–4	Stade Paimpolais FC (7)
59.	JS Cavan (8)	1–3	CS Bégard (7)
60.	US Pays Rochois (9)	2–1 (a.e.t.)	Union Squiffiec-Trégonneau (10)
61.	Écureuils de Plourivo (9)	1–4	ES Ploubazlanec (8)
62.	AS Servel-Lannion (8)	3–1	AS Trédrez-Locquémeau (12)
63.	US Brusvily (9)	0–1	Plancoët-Arguenon FC (7)
64.	US Ploubezre (8)	2–0	AS Ploumilliau (9)
65.	UO Trégor (10)	1–2	FC Trébeurden-Pleumeur-Bodou (8)
66.	US Callac (9)	1–0	AS Kérien-Magoar (10)
67.	US Briacine (9)	1–3	AS Grâces (7)
68.	FC Plouagat-Châtelaudren-Lanrodec (9)	1–0	RC Ploumagoar (8)
69.	US Goudelin (9)	1–2	JS Lanvollon (8)
70.	Goëlo FC (8)	3–2	AS Plélo (9)
71.	ES Pommerit-Le Merzer (8)	2–1	Plérin FC (7)
72.	US Glomel (10)	1–3	US Argoat-Pélem (9)
73.	US Maël-Carhaix (9)	2–4	Rostrenen FC (7)
74.	Plounévez-Lanrivain-Trémargat US (9)	5–0	US Plouguernével (10)
75.	FC La Croix-Corlay (9)	0–3	AS Uzel-Merléac (7)
76.	ES Le Fœil (10)	1–2	St Brandan-Quintin FC (8)
77.	AFC La Harmoye-St Martin-des-Prés (10)	0–11	Loudéac OSC (8)
78.	AS St Barnabé (11)	2–3	FC St Bugan (9)
79.	AS Trévé Sports (10)	0–2	US Plessala (8)
80.	AS Motterieux (9)	2–6	Plaintel SF (7)
81.	Laurmené FC (9)	4–2	CS Merdrignac (8)
82.	FC Lié (9)	6–1	La Plœucoise Foot (10)
83.	JS Landéhen (10)	0–3	Évron FC (8)
84.	AS Trémuson (8)	0–5	CS Plédran (7)
85.	Pordic-Binic FC (8)	0–4	CO Briochin Sportif Ploufraganais (7)
86.	UF Yffiniac (10)	0–5	AS Trégueux (8)
87.	US Hunaudaye (9)	0–5	US Quessoy (7)
88.	Stade Évrannais (9)	0–1	AS Trélivan (8)
89.	ASL St Julien (8)	8–4	US St Carreuc-Hénon (9)
90.	CS Lanrelas (9)	2–0	US Plouasne-St Juvat (10)
91.	AS Bobital (10)	2–1	AS Broons-Trémeur (9)
92.	ES St Cast-le-Guildo (10)	0–3	Stade Pleudihennais (8)
93.	FC Rance-Frémur (8)	1–0	US Frémur-Fresnaye (7)
94.	ES Hénansal-St Denoual-La Bouillie Emeraude (9)	2–3	US Erquy (7)
95.	JA St Servan (9)	0–3	AS Vignoc-Hédé-Guipel (7)
96.	AS Jacques Cartier (8)	1–2	Entente Samsonnaise Doloise (7)
97.	Montfort-Iffendic (10)	0–5	US Liffré (8)
98.	US Médréac (10)	2–8	FC Dinardais (7)
99.	FC Marcillé-Bazouges-St Remy-Noyal (10)	0–4	La Cancalaise (8)
100.	La Mélorienne (10)	2–1	US St Jouan-des-Guérets (8)
101.	Espérance La Bouëxière (10)	0–2	ASC Romagné (8)
102.	Pleurtuit Côte d'Emeraude (10)	0–1	Jeunesse Combourgeoise (7)
103.	US Bédée-Pleumeleuc (9)	1–3	OC Montauban (7)
104.	US St Gilles (9)	1–0	FC Beauregard Rennes (10)
105.	SEP Quédillac (9)	3–10	US Grégorienne (7)
106.	US Gosné (9)	0–3	ES Thorigné-Fouillard (7)
107.	AS Montreuil-le-Gast (12)	2–2 (3–5 p)	AS Miniac-Morvan (8)
108.	US Gévezé (8)	1–3	FC La Chapelle-Montgermont (7)
109.	USC Chavagne (9)	3–5	CO Pacéen (7)
110.	FC Sougéal (10)	0–6	Indépendante St Georges-de-Chesné (9)
111.	US Berné (10)	1–3	FC Klegereg (9)
112.	AS La Gouesnière (9)	3–2	CS Betton (8)
113.	US Château-Malo (8)	3–1	FC Baie du Mont St Michel (9)
114.	US Gaël Muel (8)	0–3	Eskouadenn de Brocéliande (7)
115.	AJS Mayotte Fougères (12)	0–6	US Billé-Javené (9)
116.	FC Breteil-Talensac (7)	6–1	US St Méen-St Onen (8)
117.	Torcé-Vergéal FC (10)	0–6	La Vitréenne FC (7)
118.	US Bel Air (9)	0–4	Espérance de Rennes (8)
119.	US Châteaugiron (8)	1–3	CS Servon (7)
120.	Domloup Sport (8)	4–7 (a.e.t.)	AS Chantepie (7)
121.	US Janzé (8)	2–1	US Laillé (8)
122.	US Vern-sur-Seiche (9)	1–0	Espérance Chartres-de-Bretagne (8)
123.	JA Balazé (8)	0–3	US Pont-Péan (9)
124.	US Bourgbarré (9)	0–0 (4–2 p)	US Val d'Izé (8)
125.	JS Nouvoitou (10)	0–10	SC Le Rheu (7)
126.	FC Bruz (8)	2–3 (a.e.t.)	AS Retiers-Coësmes (7)
127.	Ossé/St Aubin (9)	2–1	US Bain (8)
128.	FC Chapelle-Cintré (11)	1–3	US Noyal-Chatillon (9)
129.	Châteaubourg-St Melanie FA (9)	0–1	RC Rannée-La Guerche-Drouges (7)
130.	Hermine de Renac (12)	1–7	Hermitage AC (8)
131.	AS Ercé-près-Liffré (11)	0–0 (2–3 p)	Stade Louvignéen (8)
132.	US Ste Marie (11)	0–10	US Mordelles (8)
133.	US Domagné-St Didier (9)	1–2 (a.e.t.)	Noyal-Brécé FC (7)
134.	Damgan-Ambon Sport (9)	0–6	Avenir Theix (7)
135.	FC Pays d'Anast (9)	0–7	Cadets de Bains (8)
136.	JA Arzano (9)	1–0 (a.e.t.)	FC Plouay (8)
137.	Avenir Guiscriff (9)	1–2 (a.e.t.)	Stade Guémenois (10)
138.	FC Stéphanais Briçois (9)	0–0 (2–4 p)	La Chapelle-Fleurigné-Laignelet-Le Loroux (8)
139.	Vigilante Radenac (10)	0–9	Garde St Cyr Moréac (8)
140.	ES Neulliac (10)	1–4	Espérance Bréhan (8)
141.	Enfants de St Gildas (8)	1–4	CS Bignan (7)
142.	Indépendante Mauronnaise (8)	8–1	Brocéliande Campénéac (9)
143.	Caro/Missiriac AS (9)	1–2	Ruffiac-Malestroit (8)
144.	SC Sournais (10)	1–5	FC Naizin (8)
145.	Lanester FC (10)	0–1	US Le Faouët (9)
146.	Avenir Buléon-Lantillac (10)	2–6	CS Josselin (9)
147.	ASC Ste Anne-d'Auray (11)	1–4	Plouhinec FC (9)
148.	Carnac FC (10)	4–2	FOLC Lorient Ouest (8)
149.	Guénin Sport (8)	1–2	Baud FC (7)
150.	US St Melaine Rieux (9)	0–5	US La Gacilly (7)
151.	ES Mériadec (10)	1–5	ES Merlevenez (8)
152.	JA Pleucadeuc (10)	0–1	Fondelienne Carentoir (9)
153.	Caudan SF (8)	0–4	CEP Lorient (7)
154.	VFL Keryado (10)	4–3	Riantec OC (9)
155.	CS Quéven (8)	1–3	St Efflam Kervignac (9)
156.	St Jean Sport (9)	11–0	Bleuets Crédin (10)
157.	AS Penquesten (10)	1–6	AS Lanester (8)
158.	Garde du Gohazé St Thuriau (10)	2–3 (a.e.t.)	CS Pluméliau (8)
159.	EFC St Jean Brévelay (9)	0–0 (2–4 p)	US Rohannaise (10)
160.	AS Monterblanc (11)	3–2	Montagnards Sulniac (9)
161.	Garde du Loch (9)	1–1 (3–5 p)	CS Pluneret (10)
162.	CS St Gaudence Allaire (10)	2–0	Armoricaine Péaule (9)
163.	Aurore de Taupont (9)	0–5	Moutons Blanc de Noyal-Pontivy (7)
164.	ES Colpo (11)	2–2 (1–4 p)	Ajoncs d'Or Malguénac (10)
165.	Mélécienne de Plumelec (10)	0–7	AS Cruguel (8)
166.	AS Berrich-Lauzach (10)	6–4	FC St Perreux (9)
167.	Lorient Sports (8)	0–2	ES Sud Outre Rade (7)
168.	Landaul Sports (8)	4–1	ES Plescop (8)
169.	Garde Ste Anne Branderion (10)	0–5	La Guideloise (8)
170.	Semeurs de Grand-Champ (8)	3–1	FC Ploemeur (8)
171.	AS Bélugas Belz (8)	1–3	US Arradon (8)
172.	AS Priziac (10)	2–5	Languidic FC (8)
173.	ES St Avé (8)	3–4 (a.e.t.)	ES Ploemel (8)
174.	JF Noyal-Muzillac (9)	0–5	AS St Eloi La Vraie-Croix (8)
175.	FC Basse Vilaine (9)	2–0	Muzillac OS (8)
176.	St Sébastien Caden (9)	3–1	Enfants de Guer (8)
177.	AS Moustoir-Ac (10)	0–1	Avenir St Servant-sur-Oust (8)
178.	FC Linon (11)	0–12	Stade St Aubinais (8)
179.	Sarzeau FC (9)	0–6	AS Ménimur (8)
180.	Bogue D'Or Questembert (8)	3–2	Espoir St Jacut-les-Pins (9)
181.	Ajoncs d'Or St Nolff (9)	1–8	Elvinoise Foot (8)
182.	US Ploeren (10)	0–2	Séné FC (8)
183.	AS Gestel (9)	1–0	Stiren Cléguer FC (10)

== Third round ==
These matches were played on 9 and 10 September 2017.

Third round results: Bretagne

Tie no	Home team (tier)	Score	Away team (tier)
1.	AS Uzel-Merléac (7)	0–4	Lannion FC (5)
2.	Vannes OC (5)	2–0	GSI Pontivy (5)
3.	Indépendante St Georges-de-Chesné (9)	2–1	AS La Gouesnière (9)
4.	Cercle Paul Bert Bréquigny (6)	4–0	AS Vignoc-Hédé-Guipel (7)
5.	FC La Chapelle-Montgermont (7)	1–2	Fougères AGLD (6)
6.	La Cancalaise (8)	3–2	Stade St Aubinais (8)
7.	Cercle Jules Ferry (8)	3–2 (a.e.t.)	OC Montauban (7)
8.	US Liffré (8)	2–1	US St Gilles (9)
9.	AS Miniac-Morvan (8)	2–0	US Grégorienne (7)
10.	ES Thorigné-Fouillard (7)	4–0	La Chapelle-Fleurigné-Laignelet-Le Loroux (8)
11.	ASC Romagné (8)	0–1	US Billé-Javené (9)
12.	CO Pacéen (7)	0–2	TA Rennes (5)
13.	FC Dinardais (7)	1–2	Entente Samsonnaise Doloise (7)
14.	US Château-Malo (8)	2–4	OC Cesson (6)
15.	AS Chantepie (7)	0–4	FC Atlantique Vilaine (5)
16.	Hermitage AC (8)	0–2	FC Guipry-Messac (6)
17.	Eskouadenn de Brocéliande (7)	1–1 (4–2 p)	FC Breteil-Talensac (7)
18.	US Mordelles (8)	1–2	US Vern-sur-Seiche (9)
19.	Ossé/St Aubin (9)	0–6	La Vitréenne FC (7)
20.	Noyal-Brécé FC (7)	2–1	Cadets de Bains (8)
21.	FC Guichen (5)	0–0 (4–5 p)	Jeunes d'Argentré (6)
22.	US Pont-Péan (9)	1–2	Espérance de Rennes (8)
23.	Ajoncs d'Or Malguénac (10)	0–1	Ploërmel FC (6)
24.	Stade Louvignéen (8)	0–1	US Janzé (8)
25.	CS Servon (7)	0–2	AS Retiers-Coësmes (7)
26.	US Bourgbarré (9)	0–4	RC Rannée-La Guerche-Drouges (7)
27.	La Mélorienne (10)	0–3	Jeunesse Combourgeoise (7)
28.	JA Arzano (9)	0–2	CS Bignan (7)
29.	AS Lanester (8)	1–6	Keriolets de Pluvigner (6)
30.	CS Pluneret (10)	4–2	CEP Lorient (7)
31.	CS Josselin (9)	3–1	AS Monterblanc (11)
32.	FC Naizin (8)	2–4 (a.e.t.)	Indépendante Mauronnaise (8)
33.	Plouhinec FC (9)	0–5	Avenir Theix (7)
34.	AS St Eloi La Vraie-Croix (8)	2–5	Languidic FC (8)
35.	AS Ménimur (8)	1–3	US Montagnarde (5)
36.	Stade Guémenois (10)	2–1	St Jean Sport (9)
37.	Elvinoise Foot (8)	2–0	St Sébastien Caden (9)
38.	Moutons Blanc de Noyal-Pontivy (7)	0–1	US La Gacilly (7)
39.	ES Sud Outre Rade (7)	0–3	Saint-Colomban Sportive Locminé (5)
40.	Carnac FC (10)	3–0	Espérance Bréhan (8)
41.	Baud FC (7)	0–1	Semeurs de Grand-Champ (8)
42.	US Le Faouët (9)	2–1	Bogue D'Or Questembert (8)
43.	ES Ploemel (8)	1–5	Stade Pontivyen (6)
44.	FC Klegereg (9)	2–2 (4–3 p)	La Guideloise (8)
45.	FC Basse Vilaine (9)	2–2 (8–7 p)	VFL Keryado (10)
46.	US Rohannaise (10)	3–2	US Arradon (8)
47.	US Noyal-Chatillon (9)	0–6	SC Le Rheu (7)
48.	AS Berrich-Lauzach (10)	0–1	US Goëlands de Larmor-Plage (6)
49.	Garde St Cyr Moréac (8)	9–0	AS Gestel (9)
50.	Avenir St Servant-sur-Oust (8)	1–2 (a.e.t.)	AS Cruguel (8)
51.	Séné FC (8)	3–1	Landaul Sports (8)
52.	FC Quiberon St Pierre (6)	2–2 (3–2 p)	Auray FC (6)
53.	Fondelienne Carentoir (9)	0–2	CS Pluméliau (8)
54.	CS St Gaudence Allaire (10)	1–2	Ruffiac-Malestroit (8)
55.	JS Plogastel (9)	1–8	AS Plobannalec-Lesconil (7)
56.	RC Lesnevien (7)	5–0	AS Plouvien (8)
57.	EF Plougourvest (9)	0–4	Plouzané AC (6)
58.	ES Portsall Kersaint (8)	2–1	St Pierre Milizac (7)
59.	St Pierre Plouescat (9)	1–5	AG Plouvorn (7)
60.	AS Guilers (8)	1–9	Stade Plabennécois (5)
61.	FC Lanhouarneau-Plounévez-Lochrist (8)	0–3	CND Le Folgoët (8)
62.	ES Plounéventer (9)	1–2 (a.e.t.)	Bodilis-Plougar FC (7)
63.	Espérance Plouguerneau (8)	0–6	EA St Renan (6)
64.	US Poullaouen (9)	0–2	ES St Thégonnec (8)
65.	AS Santec (8)	5–2	SC Lannilis (8)
66.	US Plougonvelin (8)	3–2	ASPTT Brest (8)
67.	US Quimperoise (9)	2–5	EA Scaër (8)
68.	Gas du Menez-Hom (9)	5–3 (a.e.t.)	Étoile St Laurent (8)
69.	AC Carhaix (9)	0–5	SC Morlaix (7)
70.	Paotred Briec (9)	1–4	Landerneau FC (6)
71.	AS Gâs de Leuhan (10)	1–7	Guipavas GdR (7)
72.	AS Scrignac (8)	1–3	Stella Maris Douarnenez (7)
73.	US Cléden-Poher (10)	0–3	Landi FC (7)
74.	PB Spézet (9)	0–2	ES Plogonnec (9)
75.	AS Dirinon (9)	2–4	Quimper Italia FC (7)
76.	Cormorans Sportif de Penmarc'h (7)	2–1	US Trégunc (6)
77.	FC Le Relecq-Kerhuon (8)	1–2	Dernières Cartouches Carhaix (8)
78.	Glaziks de Coray (8)	0–1 (a.e.t.)	AS Melgven (8)
79.	Hermine Concarnoise (9)	1–0	La Plozévetienne (7)
80.	Combrit Ste Marine FC (10)	1–3	AS Plomelin (8)
81.	FC Quimperlois (7)	3–1 (a.e.t.)	US Fouesnant (7)
82.	FC Trébeurden-Pleumeur-Bodou (8)	4–2	FC Trélévern-Trévou (9)
83.	US Moëlan (7)	1–4	PD Ergué-Gabéric (5)
84.	ES Carantec-Henvic (9)	2–4	US Cléder (7)
85.	Quimper Kerfeunteun FC (8)	1–3	FC Pont-l'Abbé (8)
86.	Laurmené FC (9)	1–2 (a.e.t.)	CS Plédran (7)
87.	Quimper Ergué-Armel FC (8)	4–1	Gourlizon Sport (9)
88.	Évron FC (8)	1–2	Loudéac OSC (8)
89.	AS Trélivan (8)	1–0	ASL St Julien (8)
90.	US Quessoy (7)	2–1 (a.e.t.)	AS Ginglin Cesson (6)
91.	US Erquy (7)	1–1 (5–4 p)	CO Briochin Sportif Ploufraganais (7)
92.	AS Trégueux (8)	0–2	Stade Pleudihennais (8)
93.	US Plessala (8)	0–4	Plancoët-Arguenon FC (7)
94.	Plaintel SF (7)	6–0	FC Rance-Frémur (8)
95.	FC Lié (9)	0–5	Lamballe FC (6)
96.	AS Bobital (10)	0–6	Dinan-Léhon FC (5)
97.	US Ploubezre (8)	0–2	US Langueux (6)
98.	FC St Bugan (9)	4–0	CS Lanrelas (9)
99.	JS Lanvollon (8)	2–0	AS Grâces (7)
100.	Plounévez-Lanrivain-Trémargat US (9)	1–4	CS Bégard (7)
101.	US Callac (9)	1–4	Goëlo FC (8)
102.	US Pays Rochois (9)	2–3	ES Pommerit-Le Merzer (8)
103.	US Argoat-Pélem (9)	2–1	FC Plouagat-Châtelaudren-Lanrodec (9)
104.	AS Servel-Lannion (8)	1–10	Ploufragan FC (6)
105.	ES Ploubazlanec (8)	2–0	Rostrenen FC (7)
106.	St Brandan-Quintin FC (8)	1–4	Stade Paimpolais FC (7)
107.	ES Merlevenez (8)	3–2	St Efflam Kervignac (9)

== Fourth round ==
These matches were played on 23 and 24 September 2017.

Fourth round results: Bretagne

Tie no	Home team (tier)	Score	Away team (tier)
1.	Gas du Menez-Hom (9)	0–2	US Montagnarde (5)
2.	La Cancalaise (8)	0–9	US Saint-Malo (4)
3.	ES Pommerit-Le Merzer (8)	0–4	Stade Briochin (4)
4.	Loudéac OSC (8)	3–0	AS Miniac-Morvan (8)
5.	Semeurs de Grand-Champ (8)	1–3	AS Vitré (4)
6.	La Vitréenne FC (7)	0–1	Vannes OC (5)
7.	Plouzané AC (6)	0–1	Stade Plabennécois (5)
8.	Dernières Cartouches Carhaix (8)	1–3	US Cléder (7)
9.	CS Bégard (7)	2–1	ES St Thégonnec (8)
10.	EA St Renan (6)	8–3	RC Lesnevien (7)
11.	US Plougonvelin (8)	1–2	FC Trébeurden-Pleumeur-Bodou (8)
12.	Stade Paimpolais FC (7)	1–2	ES Portsall Kersaint (8)
13.	AS Santec (8)	0–4	Guipavas GdR (7)
14.	US Argoat-Pélem (9)	0–2 (a.e.t.)	Landi FC (7)
15.	Landerneau FC (6)	2–1	AG Plouvorn (7)
16.	SC Morlaix (7)	1–4	Lannion FC (5)
17.	Bodilis-Plougar FC (7)	1–0	ES Ploubazlanec (8)
18.	CND Le Folgoët (8)	1–3	EA Scaër (8)
19.	Stella Maris Douarnenez (7)	1–0	ES Merlevenez (8)
20.	US Le Faouët (9)	1–1 (2–4 p)	FC Klegereg (9)
21.	CS Pluneret (10)	2–1 (a.e.t.)	Stade Guémenois (10)
22.	AS Melgven (8)	1–6	Cormorans Sportif de Penmarc'h (7)
23.	CS Pluméliau (8)	1–3 (a.e.t.)	FC Quiberon St Pierre (6)
24.	AS Plomelin (8)	3–0	Hermine Concarnoise (9)
25.	ES Plogonnec (9)	4–1	Carnac FC (10)
26.	Quimper Italia FC (7)	1–4	PD Ergué-Gabéric (5)
27.	Languidic FC (8)	1–2	Quimper Ergué-Armel FC (8)
28.	US Goëlands de Larmor-Plage (6)	4–4 (3–2 p)	Keriolets de Pluvigner (6)
29.	FC Pont-l'Abbé (8)	1–2	FC Quimperlois (7)
30.	Stade Pontivyen (6)	3–0	AS Plobannalec-Lesconil (7)
31.	Goëlo FC (8)	2–2 (5–4 p)	JS Lanvollon (8)
32.	US La Gacilly (7)	0–2	Saint-Colomban Sportive Locminé (5)
33.	Stade Pleudihennais (8)	2–1	US Billé-Javené (9)
34.	Fougères AGLD (6)	0–0 (2–3 p)	Cercle Paul Bert Bréquigny (6)
35.	Entente Samsonnaise Doloise (7)	0–1	ES Thorigné-Fouillard (7)
36.	Plancoët-Arguenon FC (7)	6–5	Eskouadenn de Brocéliande (7)
37.	Cercle Jules Ferry (8)	2–1	US Quessoy (7)
38.	Lamballe FC (6)	1–0	SC Le Rheu (7)
39.	Ploufragan FC (6)	1–6	Dinan-Léhon FC (5)
40.	TA Rennes (5)	1–0	US Langueux (6)
41.	Indépendante St Georges-de-Chesné (9)	0–0 (4–5 p)	Jeunesse Combourgeoise (7)
42.	US Liffré (8)	3–0	US Erquy (7)
43.	AS Trélivan (8)	1–2	Plaintel SF (7)
44.	FC Guipry-Messac (6)	2–1	Ploërmel FC (6)
45.	US Vern-sur-Seiche (9)	1–5	Jeunes d'Argentré (6)
46.	CS Josselin (9)	0–8	Séné FC (8)
47.	FC St Bugan (9)	0–1	CS Plédran (7)
48.	FC Basse Vilaine (9)	1–0	Elvinoise Foot (8)
49.	Avenir Theix (7)	0–2	Noyal-Brécé FC (7)
50.	US Rohannaise (10)	1–2	Ruffiac-Malestroit (8)
51.	CS Bignan (7)	1–3	US Janzé (8)
52.	Indépendante Mauronnaise (8)	1–1 (0–3 p)	AS Retiers-Coësmes (7)
53.	AS Cruguel (8)	0–3	RC Rannée-La Guerche-Drouges (7)
54.	Garde St Cyr Moréac (8)	1–3	FC Atlantique Vilaine (5)
55.	Espérance de Rennes (8)	0–5	OC Cesson (6)

== Fifth round ==
These matches were played on 7 and 8 October 2017.

Fifth round results: Bretagne

Tie no	Home team (tier)	Score	Away team (tier)
1.	Ruffiac-Malestroit (8)	3–4 (a.e.t.)	Séné FC (8)
2.	US Cléder (7)	2–2 (5–3 p)	FC Quiberon St Pierre (6)
3.	Saint-Colomban Sportive Locminé (5)	2–1	FC Atlantique Vilaine (5)
4.	Goëlo FC (8)	1–3	US Montagnarde (5)
5.	Lamballe FC (6)	0–2	US Saint-Malo (4)
6.	Stade Plabennécois (5)	1–3	US Concarneau (3)
7.	US Janzé (8)	1–2	US Liffré (8)
8.	CS Plédran (7)	5–1	Cercle Jules Ferry (8)
9.	AS Retiers-Coësmes (7)	0–3	Loudéac OSC (8)
10.	CS Pluneret (10)	1–3	Cercle Paul Bert Bréquigny (6)
11.	Plancoët-Arguenon FC (7)	2–1	FC Guipry-Messac (6)
12.	OC Cesson (6)	3–1	TA Rennes (5)
13.	Stade Pleudihennais (8)	1–0	FC Basse Vilaine (9)
14.	RC Rannée-La Guerche-Drouges (7)	2–3	Vannes OC (5)
15.	ES Thorigné-Fouillard (7)	2–2 (3–4 p)	Noyal-Brécé FC (7)
16.	Jeunesse Combourgeoise (7)	1–2	Jeunes d'Argentré (6)
17.	FC Klegereg (9)	0–4	Stella Maris Douarnenez (7)
18.	CS Bégard (7)	1–1 (6–7 p)	AS Plomelin (8)
19.	PD Ergué-Gabéric (5)	1–3 (a.e.t.)	Stade Pontivyen (6)
20.	Guipavas GdR (7)	0–3	Stade Briochin (4)
21.	ES Plogonnec (9)	0–2	Landerneau FC (6)
22.	Plaintel SF (7)	1–1 (8–7 p)	EA Scaër (8)
23.	Landi FC (7)	0–1	Bodilis-Plougar FC (7)
24.	FC Quimperlois (7)	8–0	ES Portsall Kersaint (8)
25.	Cormorans Sportif de Penmarc'h (7)	2–1	FC Trébeurden-Pleumeur-Bodou (8)
26.	Quimper Ergué-Armel FC (8)	1–1 (3–2 p)	US Goëlands de Larmor-Plage (6)
27.	Lannion FC (5)	2–2 (4–5 p)	EA St Renan (6)
28.	AS Vitré (4)	2–1 (a.e.t.)	Dinan-Léhon FC (5)

== Sixth round ==
These matches were played on 21 and 22 October 2017.

Sixth round results: Bretagne

Tie no	Home team (tier)	Score	Away team (tier)
1.	Plaintel SF (7)	0–5	Stade Briochin (4)
2.	US Montagnarde (5)	1–3	US Concarneau (3)
3.	AS Plomelin (8)	2–0	Cormorans Sportif de Penmarc'h (7)
4.	Séné FC (8)	2–1 (a.e.t.)	US Cléder (7)
5.	US Liffré (8)	4–0	Quimper Ergué-Armel FC (8)
6.	Cercle Paul Bert Bréquigny (6)	0–1	Saint-Colomban Sportive Locminé (5)
7.	Landerneau FC (6)	0–4	AS Vitré (4)
8.	EA St Renan (6)	0–1	FC Quimperlois (7)
9.	Bodilis-Plougar FC (7)	0–1	CS Plédran (7)
10.	Jeunes d'Argentré (6)	1–2	Vannes OC (5)
11.	Stella Maris Douarnenez (7)	2–0	Stade Pleudihennais (8)
12.	OC Cesson (6)	0–1	Plancoët-Arguenon FC (7)
13.	Loudéac OSC (8)	0–1	Stade Pontivyen (6)
14.	Noyal-Brécé FC (7)	0–3	US Saint-Malo (4)
