= 2019–20 Coupe de France preliminary rounds, Brittany =

French football competition

The 2019–20 Coupe de France preliminary rounds, Brittany was the qualifying competition to decide which teams from the leagues of the Brittany region of France took part in the main competition from the seventh round.

A total of fourteen teams qualified from the Brittany preliminary rounds. In 2018–19, AS Vitré progressed the furthest in the main competition, reaching the quarter-final before losing to Nantes.

== Schedule ==
The first two rounds of the qualifying competition took place on the weekends of 25 August and 1 September 2019. 558 clubs entered in the first round, with 111 from Régional 3 (tier 8) and the rest from the district leagues (tier 9 and below). 22 Régional 3 and 59 Régional 2 clubs entered in the second round.

The third round draw took place on 3 September 2019. 20 teams from Régional 1 (tier 6) and the 12 teams from Championnat National 3 (tier 5) joined the competition at this stage.

The fourth round draw was published on 18 September 2019. Four teams from Championnat National 2 (tier 4) joined the competition at this stage. 55 ties were drawn.

The fifth round draw was published on 2 October 2019. The single team from Championnat National (tier 3) joined the competition at this stage. 28 ties were drawn.

The sixth round draw was published on 17 October 2019. 14 ties were drawn.

=== First round ===
These matches were played on 24 and 25 August 2019.

First round results: Brittany
Tie no	Home team (tier)	Score	Away team (tier)
1.	Pouldergat Sport (12)	1–3	Racing Cast-Porzay (11)
2.	AS Plestinaise (10)	0–4	US Pays Rochois (8)
3.	CS Trégastel (10)	4–4 (4–5 p)	Entente du Trieux FC (9)
4.	Stade Kénanais (10)	1–6	FC Plouagat-Châtelaudren-Lanrodec (8)
5.	ES Pommerit-Le Merzer (9)	1–5	AS Ploumilliau (10)
6.	AS Servel-Lannion (9)	6–1	Pléhédel Sports (10)
7.	CS Rospez (10)	0–2	JS Lanvollon (8)
8.	AS Trédrez-Locquémeau (8)	6–0	US Kérity (9)
9.	Méné Bré Sports Pédernec (10)	1–2 (a.e.t.)	ES Ploubazlanec (8)
10.	FC Trélévern-Trévou (9)	0–3 (Note: Tie won by means of forfeit.)	US Goudelin (8)
11.	ES Plougrasienne (11)	0–4	US Trieux-Lézardrieux-Pleudaniel (10)
12.	FC Lizildry (10)	4–0	US Pluzunet-Tonquédec (10)
13.	US Ploubezre (8)	1–0 (a.e.t.)	Association Mahoraise Guingamp (9)
14.	Trégor FC (9)	6–0	US Méné Bré Louargat (10)
15.	ES Rudonou (9)	3–0	Goëlo FC (8)
16.	JA Penvénan (10)	4–2	Écureuils de Plourivo (9)
17.	Étoile du Leff Boqueho (9)	0–3	JS Cavan (8)
18.	ES Trégomeuroise (10)	0–3	Union Squiffiec-Trégonneau (9)
19.	UO Trégor (9)	0–3	US Briacine (10)
20.	AS Pabu (10)	0–3	FC Tréméloir (11)
21.	ES Le Fœil (10)	0–5	US Plouisy (9)
22.	ES Frout St Agathon (10)	2–1	FC La Croix-Corlay (8)
23.	ES Trébrivan (11)	0–3	US Argoat-Pélem (9)
24.	Trieux FC (11)	0–3	AS Plélo (9)
25.	AS Trémuson (9)	0–1	AS Grâces (8)
26.	US Maël-Carhaix (10)	1–2	FC Poulancre-Múr-St Gilles (9)
27.	AS Kérien-Magoar (10)	3–2	FC L'Hermitage Lorge (11)
28.	JS Allineuc (10)	0–4	Plounévez-Lanrivain-Trémargat US (9)
29.	FC Le Vieux Bourg (11)	1–3	FC Kreiz Breizh (10)
30.	AS Plussulien (10)	0–8	FC Lié (9)
31.	Pordic-Binic FC (8)	5–4 (a.e.t.)	AS Motterieux (9)
32.	AS St Herve (9)	4–1	US St Caradec (10)
33.	US St Donan (10)	1–5	US St Carreuc-Hénon (9)
34.	St Brieuc Football Ouest (10)	0–6	St Brandan-Quintin FC (8)
35.	CS Croix Lambert (10)	0–3	Plaintel SF (8)
36.	AS Trévé Sports (10)	0–4	CS Plédran (8)
37.	AS Trébry (11)	0–8	AS Pyramide Lanfains (10)
38.	FC Moncontour-Trédaniel (9)	0–1	FC St Bugan (8)
39.	AS La Ferrière (12)	1–8	Étoile Sud Armor Porhoët (10)
40.	AS St Barnabé (10)	2–3	CS Merdrignac (8)
41.	ASL St Julien (9)	0–3	US Erquy (8)
42.	ALSL Plémy (11)	1–3	FC Côte de Penthièvre (10)
43.	Gouessant Foot Coëtmieux-Andel-Morieux-Pommeret (10)	0–4	Les Vallées FC (9)
44.	ES Hénansal-St Denoual-La Bouillie Emeraude (10)	1–7	AS Trégueux (8)
45.	ES St Cast-le-Guildo (10)	1–2	Évron FC (8)
46.	La Plœucoise Foot (10)	1–2	US Hunaudaye (9)
47.	US Mené Le Gouray (10)	0–3	US Plouasne-St Juvat (8)
48.	JS Landéhen (10)	3–0	AS Bobital (9)
49.	Val d'Arguenon Créhen-Pluduno (9)	5–1	Rance Coëtquen Football (10)
50.	ES Champs-Géraux (11)	3–0	FC St Lormel (10)
51.	CS Illifaut (10)	0–8	FC Plélan Vildé Corseul (9)
52.	US Plumaugat (11)	2–5	US Trémorel (9)
53.	US Ruca (11)	0–15	AS Broons-Trémeur (9)
54.	CS Lanrelas (9)	4–0	US Lanvallay (10)
55.	FC Beaussais-Rance-Frémur (10)	1–1 (2–3 p)	US Yvignac-la-Tour (10)
56.	UF Yffiniac (9)	0–6	ES Penguily (8)
57.	FC Hinglé-Trévron (9)	1–1 (4–3 p)	US Brusvily (10)
58.	FC Pen Hir Camaret (12)	4–1	AS Dinéault (11)
59.	AS Pont-de-Buis (9)	7–0	AS Camaretoise (10)
60.	Stade Pleybennois (9)	1–7	Gas du Menez-Hom (8)
61.	ES Cranou (10)	2–1	Lanvéoc Sports (9)
62.	US Crozon-Morgat (10)	3–3 (5–6 p)	US Quéménéven (10)
63.	Kerlaz Sport (10)	1–3	AS Telgruc-sur-Mer (10)
64.	Goulien Sports (10)	1–2	FC Penn-ar-Bed (9)
65.	Gas d'Ys Tréboul (9)	5–1	ES Beuzec (8)
66.	FC Goyen (11)	2–6	ES Mahalon-Confort (10)
67.	AS Plouhinécoise (9)	0–1	La Plozévetienne (8)
68.	Stade Pontécrucien (11)	0–2	AS Diables du Juch (10)
69.	Lapins de Guengat (11)	7–1	St Nic Sports (10)
70.	ES Plonéis (10)	0–10	Gourlizon Sport (9)
71.	US Pluguffan (9)	6–1	JS Plogastel (10)
72.	FC Bigouden (10)	1–2 (a.e.t.)	Marcassins Sportif Tréogat (10)
73.	ES Landudec-Guiler (11)	1–9	FC Quimper Penhars (10)
74.	Plonéour FC (9)	0–2	AS Plomelin (8)
75.	La Raquette Tréméoc (10)	1–0	Combrit Ste Marine FC (9)
76.	US Île-Tudy (11)	0–3	AS Loctudy (10)
77.	FC Treffiagat-Guilvinec (10)	0–8	FC Pont-l'Abbé (8)
78.	US Portugais Quimper (10)	1–9	Gars de Plomeur (10)
79.	Espoir Clohars Fouesnant (9)	0–2	Quimper Ergué-Armel FC (8)
80.	FC Odet (10)	1–5	FC Pleuvennois (9)
81.	CA Forestois (10)	1–2	US St Évarzec (9)
82.	ES Rédené (9)	1–4	Fleur de Genêt Bannalec (8)
83.	ES Névez (9)	0–3	Mélénicks Elliant (8)
84.	Locunolé Sports (10)	0–4	Hermine Concarnoise (9)
85.	Coquelicots du Trévoux (11)	0–4	US Clohars-Carnoët (10)
86.	US St Thurien (11)	6–3	AS Kernével (10)
87.	AS Melgven (9)	2–0	Glaziks de Coray (8)
88.	FC Rosporden (9)	4–1	Paotred Briec (8)
89.	US Querrien (10)	7–2	AS Motreff (10)
90.	AS St Yvi (10)	2–1	Tricolores Landrévarzec (10)
91.	FC Aven-Bélon (9)	0–1	US Moëlan (8)
92.	AS Baye (12)	1–3	AS Tréméven (11)
93.	US Quimperloise (9)	3–4	Stade Mellacois (8)
94.	Zèbres de Trégourez (11)	1–5	ES Langolen (10)
95.	Edern Sports (9)	1–3	ES Plogonnec (8)
96.	US St Hernin (12)	1–0	US Kergloff (11)
97.	US Landeleau (9)	2–3	Dernières Cartouches Carhaix (8)
98.	US Poullaouen (10)	0–2	AC Carhaix (9)
99.	Plouyé Magic United (10)	3–2	Toros Plounévézel (9)
100.	Gars de Plonévez-du-Faou (9)	1–4	Gourin FC (8)
101.	US Cléden-Poher (10)	0–5	PB Spézet (9)
102.	SS St Goazec (11)	0–2	US Châteauneuf-du-Faou (10)
103.	US Lennon (11)	0–3	ES Gouézec (10)
104.	AS Laz (11)	0–5	St Thois Sports (10)
105.	US Garlan (11)	1–5	Avenir Plourin (10)
106.	US Mespaul (11)	1–3	US Pont-Meur Guimiliau (10)
107.	Cadets de Plougoulm (11)	1–3	La Guerlesquinaise (10)
108.	ES Tréflez (11)	3–4 (a.e.t.)	US Rochoise (10)
109.	US St Servais-St Derrien (11)	0–3	Gâs de Plouider (10)
110.	US Pencran (11)	1–2	AS Sizun-Le Tréhou (10)
111.	FC Le Drennec (11)	4–1	Association Cavale Blanche Brest (10)
112.	ES Guissény (11)	1–3	Hermine Kernilis (10)
113.	US Aber-Benoît Tréglonou (11)	0–2	SC Lanrivoaré (10)
114.	PL Lambézellec (11)	3–2	AS Ploumoguer (10)
115.	ES Douron (10)	1–3	US Plouigneau (9)
116.	US Lanmeur-Plouégat-Guérand (10)	1–3	ES Carantec-Henvic (9)
117.	FC Plouezoc'h (10)	2–1 (a.e.t.)	Paotred Rosko (9)
118.	VF St Frégant (10)	0–3	CND Le Folgoët (8)
119.	PL Bergot (9)	0–4	AS Guilers (8)
120.	Étoile Trégoroise Plougasnou (9)	1–2	AS Scrignac (8)
121.	ES Pleyber-Christ (9)	0–4	Guiclan FC (8)
122.	ES Berrien-Huelgoat (10)	3–1	ES Mignonne (9)
123.	St Pierre Plouescat (9)	2–3	AS Santec (8)
124.	Stade Léonard Kreisker (9)	0–1	US Cléder (8)
125.	FC Lanhouarneau-Plounévez-Lochrist (9)	1–2	AS Berven-Plouzévédé (8)
126.	Stade Landernéen Kergrèis (9)	2–3	AS Dirinon (8)
127.	Légion St Pierre (9)	6–4	FC Le Relecq-Kerhuon (8)
128.	SC Lannilis (9)	3–5	AS Plouvien (8)
129.	Étoile St Yves Ploudaniel (9)	3–0	Espérance Plouguerneau (8)
130.	ES Locmaria-Plouzané (9)	1–1 (4–3 p)	US Plougonvelin (8)
131.	US Taulé (10)	0–1	Gars de Plouénan (9)
132.	ES Lampaulaise (10)	3–2	ES Plounéventer (9)
133.	JS St Thonanaise (10)	0–3	EF Plougourvest (9)
134.	FA de la Rade (10)	1–4	St Divy Sports (9)
135.	Avel Vor St Pabu (10)	1–1 (6–7 p)	FC Côte des Légendes (9)
136.	RC Loperhet (10)	0–7	ASC Mahoraise Brest (9)
137.	JG Forestoise (10)	1–3	AS Landeda (9)
138.	Gars St Majan (10)	0–2	AS Kersaint (9)
139.	FC Lampaulais (10)	0–1	Arzelliz Ploudalmézeau (9)
140.	Étoile St Arzel (10)	2–5	AL Coataudon (9)
141.	US Baguer-Morvan (10)	0–6	JA St Servan (8)
142.	US Château-Malo (9)	10–0	FC Bord de Rance (10)
143.	La Mélorienne (10)	1–7	La Cancalaise (8)
144.	CS La Richardais (10)	1–0	US St Jouan-des-Guérets (8)
145.	US Sens-de-Bretagne (11)	0–3	FC La Mézière-Melesse (9)
146.	FC Mordelles (9)	4–3	AS St Jacques (10)
147.	AS Parthenay-de-Bretagne (11)	4–2	FC Marcillé-Bazouges-St Remy-Noyal (10)
148.	Entente Parigné/Landéan (10)	5–0	FC des Landes (9)
149.	AS Montreuil-le-Gast (10)	1–0	US Illet Forêt (9)
150.	USC Chavagne (9)	1–2	US Gévezé (8)
151.	CS Dingé (11)	1–3	FC Stéphanais Briçois (9)
152.	AS La Gouesnière (9)	10–0	FC Meillac-Lanhélin-Bonnemain (10)
153.	US Acigné (8)	2–1	Cercle Paul Bert Gayeulles (9)
154.	Cercle Jules Ferry St Malo (9)	0–2	AS Jacques Cartier (8)
155.	ES St Germain/Montours (9)	5–0	Portes du Couesnon FC (10)
156.	AS Miniac-Morvan (8)	3–2	FC Tinténiac-St Domineuc (9)
157.	ASE Lécousse (10)	2–2 (8–9 p)	AS Livré/Mecé (11)
158.	US Cuguen (11)	0–2	JS Picanaise (9)
159.	FC Louvigné-La Bazouge (9)	2–3 (a.e.t.)	ASC Romagné (8)
160.	FC Baie du Mont St Michel (10)	4–1	AS Tremblay-Chauvigné (11)
161.	US St Marc/St Ouen (10)	1–2	Indépendante St Georges-de-Chesné (8)
162.	FC Sud Fougerais (9)	0–0 (4–5 p)	La Chapelle-Janson/Fleurigné/Laignelet-le-Louroux (8)
163.	AS Vezin-le-Coquet (10)	1–4	CS Betton (8)
164.	La Baussaine-St Thual FC (12)	2–1 (a.e.t.)	FC Plerguer/Roz-Landrieux (11)
165.	Fougères FC (10)	3–4	US Billé-Javené (8)
166.	Breizh Fobal Klub (10)	2–3	FC La Chapelle-Montgermont (8)
167.	Stade St Aubinais (8)	4–1	Espérance La Bouëxière (9)
168.	US Gosné (10)	0–1	FC Hermitage-Chapelle-Cintré (8)
169.	AS St Pierraise Épiniac (9)	1–2	FC Aubinois (8)
170.	US St Guinoux (10)	0–10	Pleurtuit Côte d'Emeraude (8)
171.	AS Ercé-près-Liffré (9)	0–1	FC Beauregard Rennes (8)
172.	Cercle Paul Bert Cleunay (11)	5–2	Entente Langan-La Chapelle-Chausée (11)
173.	Montfort-Iffendic (10)	3–4	SEP Quédillac (8)
174.	US Le Crouais (11)	0–4	US Médréac (9)
175.	AS St Pern/Landujan (10)	2–1	US St Méen-St Onen (8)
176.	US Gaël Muel (10)	0–3	Avenir Irodouër (8)
177.	Espérance Sixt-sur-Aff (9)	0–2	Hermine La Noë Blanche (10)
178.	Cadets Chelun Martigné-Ferchaud (10)	4–0	ASC St Erblon (10)
179.	US Val d'Izé (9)	4–1 (a.e.t.)	AS Étrelles (10)
180.	Hermine de Renac (11)	0–2	Réveil de Lohéac (10)
181.	OC Brétillien (11)	5–1	US Tresbœuf-Le Sel-Lallieu (12)
182.	US Bais (10)	0–4	US Janzé (8)
183.	US Guignen (9)	0–0 (5–4 p)	AS Retiers-Coësmes (8)
184.	Ossé/St Aubin (10)	1–5	JA Balazé (8)
185.	US St Armel (10)	0–3	JA Bréal (8)
186.	US Pont-Péan (10)	0–3	US Bédée-Pleumeleuc (8)
187.	SC Goven (10)	2–3	JA Pipriac (9)
188.	Olympic Montreuil-Landavran (10)	0–1	Avenir Domalain (10)
189.	US Les Brulais-Comblessac (12)	0–4	Groupe St Yves St Just (10)
190.	Châteaubourg FC (9)	7–1	US Corps-Nuds (10)
191.	US Erbrée-Mondevert (10)	1–2 (a.e.t.)	Stade Louvignéen (8)
192.	US Vern-sur-Seiche (8)	0–2 (a.e.t.)	Espérance de Rennes (9)
193.	FC Pays d'Anast (10)	0–1	US Bain (9)
194.	US Bourgbarré (9)	2–5	Domloup Sport (8)
195.	JS Nouvoitou (10)	1–8	FC Bruz (8)
196.	Haute Vilaine FC (10)	1–2	Châteaubourg-St Melaine FA (9)
197.	ES Boistrudan-Piré (11)	0–2	US Domagné-St Didier (9)
198.	ES Taillis-St Christophe (10)	2–4	Torcé-Vergéal FC (10)
199.	US Bel Air (9)	3–0	Reveil Seglinois (10)
200.	SC St Senoux (9)	0–4	US Laillé (8)
201.	Association Châtillon-en-Vendelais/Princé (10)	0–1	Bleuets Le Pertre-Brielles-Gennes-St Cyr (9)
202.	FC Baulon-Lassy (11)	0–1 (a.e.t.)	US Ste Marie (10)
203.	Espérance Bréal-sous-Vitré (10)	2–3 (a.e.t.)	ES St Aubin-des-Landes/EF Cornillé (11)
204.	Eskouadenn de Brocéliande (8)	2–0	Avenir Lieuron (9)
205.	AS Romille (11)	0–3	US Noyal-Chatillon (10)
206.	AS Guermeur	0–2	JA Arzano (9)
207.	Lorient Sports (8)	1–2	Riantec OC (9)
208.	FOLC Lorient Ouest (9)	4–9	FC Ploemeur (8)
209.	Lanester FC (9)	1–2	CS Quéven (8)
210.	FC Kerzec	1–4	US Berné (10)
211.	Caudan SF (9)	3–1	AS Gestel (8)
212.	Stiren Cléguer FC (9)	1–1 (4–3 p)	La Guideloise (8)
213.	AS Calanaise (10)	3–4	Entente St Gilloise (11)
214.	FL Inguiniel (10)	2–1	VFL Keryado (10)
215.	FC Meslan	4–5	Avenir du Pays Pourleth (10)
216.	US Le Faouët (9)	3–2	FC Kerchopine (10)
217.	AS Priziac (10)	1–2	Avenir Guiscriff (9)
218.	Stade Guémenois (9)	1–2	FC Klegereg (8)
219.	Ajoncs d'Or St Malguénac (9)	4–2 (a.e.t.)	SC Sournais (10)
220.	Garde St Eloi Kerfourn (8)	0–2	AL Camors (9)
221.	US Rohannaise (11)	3–0	FC Gueltas-St Gérand-St Gonnery (10)
222.	Bleuets de Crédin (10)	7–2	AS Kergrist
223.	St Pierre Pleugriffet (10)	0–2	Espérance Bréhan (8)
224.	Avenir de Guilliers (10)	8–1	Garde de l'Yvel Loyat
225.	Bleuets Néant-sur-Yvel (10)	1–4	Caro/Missiriac AS (9)
226.	OC Beignon (10)	0–3	US La Gacilly (8)
227.	ES Quelneuc (10)	2–1	Garde de Mi-Voie Guillac (10)
228.	Fondelienne Carentoir (9)	2–2 (7–6 p)	Les Fougerêts-St Martin-sur-Oust (10)
229.	FC Cournon 56 (10)	2–4	St Léon de Glénac (11)
230.	Indépendante Mauronnaise (9)	4–2	Avenir Campénéac Augan (10)
231.	Espoir St Jacut-les-Pins (9)	3–0 (Note: Tie reversed with agreement of both clubs.)	Avenir St Vincent-sur-Oust (10)
232.	FC St Perreux (10)	0–3	US St Melaine Rieux (9)
233.	CS St Gaudence Allaire (10)	1–2	Ruffiac-Malestroit (8)
234.	La Patriote Malansac (8)	3–0	Étoile de l'Oust St Congard-St Laurent (9)
235.	St Sébastien Caden (10)	2–1 (a.e.t.)	FC Basse Vilaine (8)
236.	Armoricaine Péaule (9)	0–2	Garde du Pont Marzan (8)
237.	AG Arzal (10)	2–1	Damgan-Ambon Sport (9)
238.	AS Belle-Île-en-Mer	0–1	Carnac FC (9)
239.	AS Bélugas Belz (8)	4–0	ES Crac'h (9)
240.	Avenir Ste Hélène (10)	1–3	Stade Landévantais (9)
241.	ES Merlevenez (9)	2–2 (5–3 p)	St Efflam Kervignac (8)
242.	AS Bubry (9)	6–0	Fleur d'Ajonc Inzinzac (10)
243.	Guénin Sport (8)	0–4	AS Kergonan (9)
244.	ES Remungol	1–3	Melrand Sports (10)
245.	La Locminoise (10)	3–1	CS Pluméliau (8)
246.	Cadets de Guéhenno	1–2	St Clair Réguiny (10)
247.	CS Josselin (8)	5–0	Ecureils Roc-St André (9)
248.	Enfants de St Gildas (9)	3–0	La Mélécienne de Plumelec (10)
249.	AS Croix-Helléan (10)	5–0	Vigilante Radenac
250.	Aurore de Taupont (9)	1–4	FC Naizin (8)
251.	Avenir St Servant-sur-Oust (9)	1–4	Garde St Cyr Moréac (8)
252.	US St Abraham Chapelle-Caro (9)	7–2	JA Pleucadeuc (10)
253.	Chevaliers St Maurice St Guyomard (10)	1–4	La Sérentaise (9)
254.	AS St Eloi La Vraie-Croix (9)	3–2	ES Larré-Molac (10)
255.	JF Noyal-Muzillac (9)	4–1	Gentienne Pluherlin (10)
256.	ES Trinitaine	0–3	AS Berrich-Lauzach (10)
257.	ES Surzur (10)	0–1	Sarzeau FC (8)
258.	CS Pluneret (10)	2–3	ES Mériadec (9)
259.	AS Brandivy (12)	0–9	AS Brévelaise (11)
260.	Semeurs de Grand-Champ (9)	1–0	Garde du Loch (10)
261.	AS Moustoir-Ac (9)	1–2	Plumelin Sports (8)
262.	EFC St Jean Brévelay (8)	2–1	Rah-Koëd Plaudren FC (9)
263.	Garde St Arnould St Allouestre (11)	1–8	ES Colpo (10)
264.	AS Monterblanc (8)	2–5	US Brech (9)
265.	AS Meucon (9)	4–2 (a.e.t.)	US Le Cours (10)
266.	ES St Avé (8)	4–3 (a.e.t.)	Montagnards Sulniac (9)
267.	Ajoncs d'Or St Nolff (11)	1–2	ASC Baden (10)
268.	US Ploeren (9)	2–2 (5–4 p)	ES Plescop (8)
269.	Prat Poulfanc Sport (11)	6–0	AS Le Tour-de-Parc (10)
270.	Paotred du Tarun (10)	3–2	Garde du Gohazé St Thuriau (10)
271.	JA Peillac (10)	0–7	Bogue D'Or Questembert (8)
272.	AS Arzon (11)	1–5	AS Turcs de l'Ouest (10)
273.	AS Penquesten (10)	1–2	AS Pluvignoise (10)
274.	Stade Hennebontais (10)	0–7	Landaul Sports (8)
275.	Hermine Locoal-Mendon (10)	0–9	AS Plougoumelen-Bono (9)
276.	Erdeven-Étel (10)	1–8	ASC Ste Anne-d'Auray (10)
277.	AS Plouharnel (10)	0–2	ES Ploemel (8)
278.	FC Locmariaquer-St Philibert (9)	1–1 (1–4 p)	US Arradon (8)
279.	US Langoelan (10)	5–1	ES Ségliennaise (11)

=== Second round ===
These matches were played on 30 August and 1 September 2019.

Second round results: Brittany
Tie no	Home team (tier)	Score	Away team (tier)
1.	Réveil de Lohéac (10)	0–2	Eskouadenn de Brocéliande (8)
2.	AS Telgruc-sur-Mer (10)	0–2	Gas du Menez-Hom (8)
3.	St Thois Sports (10)	2–7	Dernières Cartouches Carhaix (8)
4.	Gourin FC (8)	4–1	AS Pont-de-Buis (9)
5.	ES Plogonnec (8)	4–2	EA Scaër (7)
6.	US St Hernin (12)	0–3	Racing Cast-Porzay (11)
7.	FC Pen Hir Camaret (12)	1–0	Plouyé Magic United (10)
8.	ES Gouézec (10)	1–4	US Châteauneuf-du-Faou (10)
9.	ES Langolen (10)	1–1 (8–9 p)	US Quéménéven (10)
10.	PB Spézet (9)	2–1	AC Carhaix (9)
11.	AS Plomelin (8)	0–1	La Plozévetienne (8)
12.	Cormorans Sportif de Penmarc'h (8)	2–0	Amicale Italia Bretagne (7)
13.	Gourlizon Sport (9)	2–0	FC Quimper Penhars (10)
14.	Marcassins Sportif Tréogat (10)	1–4	Gas d'Ys Tréboul (9)
15.	Lapins de Guengat (11)	1–5	Quimper Ergué-Armel FC (8)
16.	Gars de Plomeur (10)	0–1	FC Penn-ar-Bed (9)
17.	AS Loctudy (10)	0–3	FC Pont-l'Abbé (8)
18.	ES Mahalon-Confort (10)	0–2	AS Plobannalec-Lesconil (7)
19.	US Pluguffan (9)	6–0	La Raquette Tréméoc (10)
20.	AS Diables du Juch (10)	1–3	Quimper Kerfeunteun FC (7)
21.	US Clohars-Carnoët (10)	0–2	AS Melgven (9)
22.	US St Évarzec (9)	0–4	US Quimperoise (7)
23.	US Querrien (10)	0–5	Fleur de Genêt Bannalec (8)
24.	FC Pleuvennois (9)	1–0	Hermine Concarnoise (9)
25.	US Moëlan (8)	6–1	Stade Mellacois (8)
26.	AS St Yvi (10)	1–11	Amicale Ergué-Gabéric (8)
27.	US St Thurien (11)	0–8	US Fouesnant (8)
28.	Mélénicks Elliant (8)	2–1	FC Quimperlois (7)
29.	AS Tréméven (11)	0–4	FC Rosporden (9)
30.	AS Scrignac (8)	1–2	AS Berven-Plouzévédé (8)
31.	ES Carantec-Henvic (9)	3–0	FC Plouezoc'h (10)
32.	Guiclan FC (8)	3–0	JU Plougonven (7)
33.	AS St Martin-des-Champs (8)	2–1	SC Morlaix (7)
34.	US Plouigneau (9)	1–2	ES St Thégonnec (7)
35.	EF Plougourvest (9)	3–0	Avenir Plourin (10)
36.	La Guerlesquinaise (10)	0–5	US Cléder (8)
37.	ES Berrien-Huelgoat (10)	0–2	AS Santec (8)
38.	Gars de Plouénan (9)	0–4	AG Plouvorn (7)
39.	US Rochoise (10)	1–5	Étoile St Yves Ploudaniel (9)
40.	ES Cranou (10)	0–2	Landi FC (8)
41.	AS Sizun-Le Tréhou (10)	2–2 (2–4 p)	AS Brest (7)
42.	FC Côte des Légendes (9)	1–0	US Pont-Meur Guimiliau (10)
43.	Étoile St Laurent (7)	2–1	CND Le Folgoët (8)
44.	Plougastel FC (7)	1–0	AS Dirinon (8)
45.	St Divy Sports (9)	0–1	RC Lesnevien (7)
46.	ES Lampaulaise (10)	0–1	Bodilis-Plougar FC (8)
47.	Landerneau FC (7)	5–0 (Note: Tie reversed with agreement of both clubs.)	Gâs de Plouider (10)
48.	AS Guilers (8)	3–2 (a.e.t.)	Arzelliz Ploudalmézeau (9)
49.	AS Kersaint (9)	1–2	ES Portsall Kersaint (7)
50.	AL Coataudon (9)	0–0 (4–5 p)	ES Locmaria-Plouzané (9)
51.	Légion St Pierre (9)	2–1	FC Gouesnou (7)
52.	AS Plouvien (8)	1–0	Vie au Grand Air Bohars (8)
53.	Hermine Kernilis (10)	0–3	Gars de St Yves (7)
54.	ASC Mahoraise Brest (9)	0–3	ASPTT Brest (7)
55.	PL Lambézellec (11)	2–0	FC Le Drennec (11)
56.	SC Lanrivoaré (10)	1–3	AS Landeda (9)
57.	La Cancalaise (8)	1–0	Jeunesse Combourgeoise (7)
58.	FC Baie du Mont St Michel (10)	2–4	JA St Servan (8)
59.	AS Jacques Cartier (8)	3–0	AS La Gouesnière (9)
60.	Pleurtuit Côte d'Emeraude (8)	0–3	FC Dinardais (7)
61.	La Baussaine-St Thual FC (12)	0–6	US Château-Malo (9)
62.	Indépendante St Georges-de-Chesné (8)	0–7	US Liffré (7)
63.	CS La Richardais (10)	1–2	Entente Samsonnaise Doloise (7)
64.	FC Aubinois (8)	0–6	US Grégorienne (7)
65.	ASC Romagné (8)	2–1 (a.e.t.)	Noyal-Brécé FC (7)
66.	Cercle Paul Bert Cleunay (11)	1–10	CS Betton (8)
67.	AS Parthenay-de-Bretagne (11)	0–2	AS Miniac-Morvan (8)
68.	US Acigné (8)	1–1 (6–5 p)	FC Mordelles (9)
69.	US Gévezé (8)	2–1 (a.e.t.)	FC La Mézière-Melesse (9)
70.	FC Beauregard Rennes (8)	1–0	Stade St Aubinais (8)
71.	AS Livré/Mecé (11)	2–4	US Billé-Javené (8)
72.	CO Pacéen (7)	3–0	FC La Chapelle-Montgermont (8)
73.	ES Thorigné-Fouillard (8)	0–2	Cercle Paul Bert Bréquigny (7)
74.	JS Picanaise (9)	1–3	ES St Germain/Montours (9)
75.	FC Stéphanais Briçois (9)	2–0	AS Montreuil-le-Gast (10)
76.	CS Servon (8)	3–4	US St Gilles (7)
77.	SEP Quédillac (8)	2–0	Espérance de Rennes (9)
78.	US Noyal-Chatillon (10)	1–5	US Bel Air (9)
79.	AS Chantepie (8)	3–3 (4–5 p)	US Guignen (9)
80.	Bleuets Le Pertre-Brielles-Gennes-St Cyr (9)	0–2 (a.e.t.)	RC Rannée-La Guerche-Drouges (7)
81.	Entente Parigné/Landéan (10)	0–4	La Chapelle-Janson/Fleurigné/Laignelet-le-Louroux (8)
82.	Cadets Chelun Martigné-Ferchaud (10)	1–2 (a.e.t.)	US Janzé (8)
83.	La Vitréenne FC (7)	4–5 (a.e.t.)	Domloup Sport (8)
84.	Stade Louvignéen (8)	0–1	US Val d'Izé (9)
85.	FC Hermitage-Chapelle-Cintré (8)	1–4	Espérance Chartres-de-Bretagne (7)
86.	Groupe St Yves St Just (10)	0–2	US Bain (9)
87.	OC Brétillien (11)	0–9	JA Balazé (8)
88.	Avenir Irodouër (8)	1–3	OC Montauban (7)
89.	FC Bruz (8)	5–2	JA Pipriac (9)
90.	US Bédée-Pleumeleuc (8)	3–1	US Médréac (9)
91.	Avenir Domalain (10)	3–2	Châteaubourg-St Melaine FA (9)
92.	Châteaubourg FC (9)	1–2	Jeunes d'Argentré (7)
93.	Hermine La Noë Blanche (10	0–9	US Laillé (8)
94.	Torcé-Vergéal FC (10)	1–1 (6–7 p)	US Domagné-St Didier (9)
95.	AS St Pern/Landujan (10)	0–2	JA Bréal (8)
96.	US Ste Marie (10)	1–3	Cadets de Bains (7)
97.	ES St Aubin-des-Landes/EF Cornillé (11)	1–5	US Châteaugiron (7)
98.	FC Ploemeur (8)	3–1	Caudan SF (9)
99.	CS Quéven (8)	5–0	Stiren Cléguer FC (9)
100.	JA Arzano (9)	3–2	FC Plouay (7)
101.	Avenir Guiscriff (9)	8–3	US Langoelan (10)
102.	US Berné (10)	1–6	US Le Faouët (9)
103.	Avenir du Pays Pourleth (10)	3–2 (a.e.t.)	AS Bubry (9)
104.	FC Klegereg (8)	0–0 (2–4 p)	Moutons Blanc de Noyal-Pontivy (7)
105.	Espérance Bréhan (8)	2–1	Ajoncs d'Or St Malguénac (9)
106.	Caro/Missiriac AS (9)	0–2	Enfants de Guer (7)
107.	Ruffiac-Malestroit (8)	2–0	US St Abraham Chapelle-Caro (9)
108.	US La Gacilly (8)	0–1	Fondelienne Carentoir (9)
109.	St Léon de Glénac (11)	1–2	ES Quelneuc (10)
110.	Riantec OC (9)	3–0	ES Sud Outre Rade (8)
111.	Espoir St Jacut-les-Pins (9)	0–2	La Patriote Malansac (8)
112.	US St Melaine Rieux (9)	1–2	St Sébastien Caden (10)
113.	Garde du Pont Marzan (8)	4–1	JF Noyal-Muzillac (9)
114.	Entente St Gilloise (11)	2–1	FL Inguiniel (10)
115.	AS Kergonan (9)	1–4	Languidic FC (7)
116.	Melrand Sports (10)	1–6	Baud FC (8)
117.	FC Naizin (8)	2–0	Enfants de St Gildas (9)
118.	St Clair Réguiny (10)	2–4	CS Josselin (8)
119.	La Sérentaise (9)	0–9	Ploërmel FC (7)
120.	Bogue D'Or Questembert (8)	2–0	Elvinoise Foot (7)
121.	AS Berrich-Lauzach (10)	0–4	Muzillac OS (8)
122.	Sarzeau FC (8)	1–4	Avenir Theix (7)
123.	Carnac FC (9)	1–7	AS Bélugas Belz (8)
124.	ES Ploemel (8)	1–1 (6–5 p)	US Goëlands de Larmor-Plage (8)
125.	Stade Landévantais (9)	1–0	FC Quiberon St Pierre (8)
126.	Landaul Sports (8)	4–2	ES Merlevenez (9)
127.	AL Camors (9)	2–1	AS Lanester (8)
128.	Plumelin Sports (8)	0–2	CS Bignan (7)
129.	AS Brévelaise (11)	1–3 (a.e.t.)	La Locminoise (10)
130.	Garde St Cyr Moréac (8)	0–2	AS Cruguel (8)
131.	US Brech (9)	2–2 (1–4 p)	Auray FC (7)
132.	ASC Ste Anne-d'Auray (10)	2–3	Plouhinec FC (8)
133.	ES Mériadec (9)	1–1 (2–3 p)	AS Pluvignoise (10)
134.	AS Plougoumelen-Bono (9)	4–2	ES St Avé (8)
135.	ASC Baden (10)	3–2	AS Meucon (9)
136.	US Arradon (8)	4–1	US Ploeren (9)
137.	AS Turcs de l'Ouest (10)	0–2	AS Ménimur (7)
138.	Prat Poulfanc Sport (11)	0–1	AG Arzal (10)
139.	US Rohannaise (11)	1–2	AS Croix-Helléan (10)
140.	Avenir de Guilliers (10)	2–6	EFC St Jean Brévelay (8)
141.	Bleuets de Crédin (10)	1–2	Indépendante Mauronnaise (9)
142.	ES Colpo (10)	3–2	AS St Eloi La Vraie-Croix (9)
143.	Paotred du Tarun (10)	1–2	Semeurs de Grand-Champ (9)
144.	AS Ploumilliau (10)	2–1	Trégor FC (9)
145.	Entente du Trieux FC (9)	1–1 (4–2 p)	AS Trédrez-Locquémeau (8)
146.	US Plouisy (9)	3–2	US Perros-Louannec (7)
147.	AS Plélo (9)	3–0	FC Lizildry (10)
148.	US Briacine (10)	1–6	FC Trébeurden-Pleumeur-Bodou (8)
149.	AS Grâces (8)	2–1	AS Servel-Lannion (9)
150.	US Trieux-Lézardrieux-Pleudaniel (10)	1–2	Pordic-Binic FC (8)
151.	Union Squiffiec-Trégonneau (9)	2–5	Stade Paimpolais FC (7)
152.	ES Rudonou (9)	1–6	RC Ploumagoar (7)
153.	FC Tréméloir (11)	0–1	US Ploubezre (8)
154.	JA Penvénan (10)	0–4	JS Lanvollon (8)
155.	US Goudelin (8)	4–2	CS Bégard (7)
156.	ES Ploubazlanec (8)	2–5 (a.e.t.)	Plérin FC (7)
157.	AS Pleubian-Pleumeur (7)	4–2 (a.e.t.)	US Pays Rochois (8)
158.	ES Frout St Agathon (10)	0–1	JS Cavan (8)
159.	FC Kreiz Breizh (10)	1–3	AS St Herve (9)
160.	US Argoat-Pélem (9)	2–1	AS Uzel-Merléac (7)
161.	FC Poulancre-Múr-St Gilles (9)	1–4	Rostrenen FC (8)
162.	Plounévez-Lanrivain-Trémargat US (9)	1–0	AS Kérien-Magoar (10)
163.	FC Plouagat-Châtelaudren-Lanrodec (8)	2–8	CO Briochin Sportif Ploufraganais (7)
164.	FC Lié (9)	0–3	Ploufragan FC (7)
165.	AS Pyramide Lanfains (10)	0–8	AS Trégueux (8)
166.	St Brandan-Quintin FC (8)	0–2	AS Ginglin Cesson (7)
167.	US St Carreuc-Hénon (9)	1–2	FC St Bugan (8)
168.	Plaintel SF (8)	3–0	FC Centre Bretagne (7)
169.	Étoile Sud Armor Porhoët (10)	1–3	CS Lanrelas (9)
170.	Évron FC (8)	0–1	US Frémur-Fresnaye (7)
171.	US Hunaudaye (9)	0–3	AS Hillion-St René (8)
172.	US Erquy (8)	6–3	Val d'Arguenon Créhen-Pluduno (9)
173.	FC Plélan Vildé Corseul (9)	2–1	Stade Pleudihennais (7)
174.	Les Vallées FC (9)	1–0	CS Plédran (8)
175.	FC Côte de Penthièvre (10)	1–0	FC Hinglé-Trévron (9)
176.	AS Broons-Trémeur (9)	4–1	JS Landéhen (10)
177.	US Trémorel (9)	1–3	ES Penguily (8)
178.	US Plouasne-St Juvat (8)	1–2	AS Trélivan (7)
179.	CS Merdrignac (8)	1–4	Stade Évrannais (8)
180.	US Yvignac-la-Tour (10)	2–3	ES Champs-Géraux (11)

=== Third round ===
These matches were played on 14 and 15 September 2019.

Third round results: Brittany
Tie no	Home team (tier)	Score	Away team (tier)
1.	ES St Thégonnec (7)	1–2 (a.e.t.)	Plouzané AC (5)
2.	AS Landeda (9)	2–0	FC Côte des Légendes (9)
3.	AG Plouvorn (7)	5–1	AS Guilers (8)
4.	AS Santec (8)	2–1	AS Brest (7)
5.	Étoile St Yves Ploudaniel (9)	0–0 (4–5 p)	ASPTT Brest (7)
6.	EF Plougourvest (9)	1–2 (a.e.t.)	Stade Plabennécois (5)
7.	Landi FC (8)	2–0	AS St Martin-des-Champs (8)
8.	Légion St Pierre (9)	3–2	RC Lesnevien (7)
9.	ES Portsall Kersaint (7)	1–1 (3–4 p)	St Pierre Milizac (6)
10.	Guiclan FC (8)	0–1 (a.e.t.)	AS Plouvien (8)
11.	PL Lambézellec (11)	0–6	Bodilis-Plougar FC (8)
12.	Guipavas GdR (6)	1–0	Landerneau FC (7)
13.	US Cléder (8)	0–4	Plougastel FC (7)
14.	AS Berven-Plouzévédé (8)	0–1	ES Carantec-Henvic (9)
15.	ES Locmaria-Plouzané (9)	0–4	Gars de St Yves (7)
16.	Étoile St Laurent (7)	2–1	EA St Renan (6)
17.	Racing Cast-Porzay (11)	0–4	Quimper Ergué-Armel FC (8)
18.	FC Pen Hir Camaret (12)	0–3	PB Spézet (9)
19.	FC Pleuvennois (9)	1–4 (a.e.t.)	US Quimperoise (7)
20.	Gourlizon Sport (9)	0–3	PD Ergué-Gabéric (5)
21.	FC Pont-l'Abbé (8)	2–2 (4–1 p)	US Fouesnant (8)
22.	FC Penn-ar-Bed (9)	0–1 (a.e.t.)	Gas d'Ys Tréboul (9)
23.	Quimper Kerfeunteun FC (7)	4–1 (a.e.t.)	Châteaulin FC (6)
24.	US Châteauneuf-du-Faou (10)	0–4	Gas du Menez-Hom (8)
25.	Fleur de Genêt Bannalec (8)	2–1	US Moëlan (8)
26.	US Pluguffan (9)	0–7	Stella Maris Douarnenez (6)
27.	Amicale Ergué-Gabéric (8)	1–0	AS Plobannalec-Lesconil (7)
28.	US Quéménéven (10)	1–8	Cormorans Sportif de Penmarc'h (8)
29.	AS Melgven (9)	0–3	Mélénicks Elliant (8)
30.	La Plozévetienne (8)	2–1	Gourin FC (8)
31.	Dernières Cartouches Carhaix (8)	7–0	ES Plogonnec (8)
32.	FC Rosporden (9)	1–2	US Trégunc (5)
33.	US Val d'Izé (9)	0–2	AS Vignoc-Hédé-Guipel (6)
34.	US Bédée-Pleumeleuc (8)	0–7	FC Breteil-Talensac (6)
35.	US Liffré (7)	3–0	La Chapelle-Janson/Fleurigné/Laignelet-le-Louroux (8)
36.	JA St Servan (8)	0–1	CS Betton (8)
37.	FC Stéphanais Briçois (9)	0–1	Entente Samsonnaise Doloise (7)
38.	US St Gilles (7)	2–4	US Billé-Javené (8)
39.	AS Miniac-Morvan (8)	0–2	La Cancalaise (8)
40.	US Château-Malo (9)	0–1	OC Montauban (7)
41.	ES St Germain/Montours (9)	2–0	SEP Quédillac (8)
42.	ASC Romagné (8)	0–1	OC Cesson (6)
43.	FC Dinardais (7)	3–2 (a.e.t.)	AS Jacques Cartier (8)
44.	US Gévezé (8)	0–2	Fougères AGLD (5)
45.	US Grégorienne (7)	0–3	SC Le Rheu (6)
46.	Jeunes d'Argentré (7)	2–1	FC Beauregard Rennes (8)
47.	Eskouadenn de Brocéliande (8)	0–5	US Châteaugiron (7)
48.	US Bain (9)	1–1 (5–4 p)	US Bel Air (9)
49.	US Janzé (8)	1–8	FC Guipry-Messac (6)
50.	Domloup Sport (8)	0–4	CO Pacéen (7)
51.	JA Balazé (8)	1–3	Cercle Paul Bert Bréquigny (7)
52.	JA Bréal (8)	2–3	US Guignen (9)
53.	US Laillé (8)	1–7	FC Atlantique Vilaine (6)
54.	US Acigné (8)	0–1	FC Guichen (5)
55.	RC Rannée-La Guerche-Drouges (7)	1–3	Espérance Chartres-de-Bretagne (7)
56.	US Domagné-St Didier (9)	5–0	Avenir Domalain (10)
57.	FC Bruz (8)	0–8	TA Rennes (5)
58.	Cadets de Bains (7)	2–1 (a.e.t.)	Ruffiac-Malestroit (8)
59.	Pordic-Binic FC (8)	1–0	AS Pleubian-Pleumeur (7)
60.	Plounévez-Lanrivain-Trémargat US (9)	1–5	AS Grâces (8)
61.	Stade Paimpolais FC (7)	1–0	US Langueux (6)
62.	Plérin FC (7)	0–0 (3–4 p)	US Goudelin (8)
63.	US Ploubezre (8)	2–3	AS Plélo (9)
64.	FC Trébeurden-Pleumeur-Bodou (8)	4–0	US Argoat-Pélem (9)
65.	US Plouisy (9)	0–3	Loudéac OSC (6)
66.	Rostrenen FC (8)	3–3 (4–5 p)	JS Cavan (8)
67.	RC Ploumagoar (7)	0–3	Lannion FC (5)
68.	AS Ploumilliau (10)	3–0	Entente du Trieux FC (9)
69.	JS Lanvollon (8)	0–3	US Quessoy (6)
70.	Les Vallées FC (9)	3–1 (a.e.t.)	FC Côte de Penthièvre (10)
71.	AS Trégueux (8)	1–0	Ploufragan FC (7)
72.	Stade Évrannais (8)	2–0	AS Hillion-St René (8)
73.	FC St Bugan (8)	3–2	AS Broons-Trémeur (9)
74.	ES Penguily (8)	3–1	AS Trélivan (7)
75.	Plancoët-Arguenon FC (6)	0–2	Lamballe FC (6)
76.	AS St Herve (9)	0–4	US Erquy (8)
77.	FC Plélan Vildé Corseul (9)	0–7	CO Briochin Sportif Ploufraganais (7)
78.	CS Lanrelas (9)	1–1 (4–5 p)	Plaintel SF (8)
79.	US Frémur-Fresnaye (7)	1–5	Dinan-Léhon FC (5)
80.	ES Champs-Géraux (11)	0–9	AS Ginglin Cesson (7)
81.	ASC Baden (10)	1–7	Séné FC (6)
82.	AS Ménimur (7)	6–2	Auray FC (7)
83.	AS Pluvignoise (10)	1–5	Garde du Pont Marzan (8)
84.	Avenir du Pays Pourleth (10)	2–6	AS Bélugas Belz (8)
85.	Indépendante Mauronnaise (9)	1–0	US Arradon (8)
86.	AS Croix-Helléan (10)	0–8	Riantec OC (9)
87.	Plouhinec FC (8)	1–6	Stade Pontivyen (5)
88.	Enfants de Guer (7)	1–2	FC Ploemeur (8)
89.	La Patriote Malansac (8)	3–2	CS Bignan (7)
90.	AS Cruguel (8)	3–1	AL Camors (9)
91.	EFC St Jean Brévelay (8)	1–3	CS Josselin (8)
92.	US Le Faouët (9)	3–0	La Locminoise (10)
93.	Muzillac OS (8)	2–2 (4–5 p)	Baud FC (8)
94.	Fondelienne Carentoir (9)	2–1 (a.e.t.)	Avenir Guiscriff (9)
95.	St Sébastien Caden (10)	1–0	Stade Landévantais (9)
96.	Entente St Gilloise (11)	1–4	AS Plougoumelen-Bono (9)
97.	ES Quelneuc (10)	2–3	FC Naizin (8)
98.	Languidic FC (7)	0–4	Ploërmel FC (7)
99.	AG Arzal (10)	2–1	ES Ploemel (8)
100.	Landaul Sports (8)	0–4	US Montagnarde (6)
101.	Keriolets de Pluvigner (6)	0–3	Saint-Colomban Sportive Locminé (5)
102.	Semeurs de Grand-Champ (9)	1–2	Moutons Blanc de Noyal-Pontivy (7)
103.	GSI Pontivy (5)	2–4 (a.e.t.)	CEP Lorient (6)
104.	CS Quéven (8)	8–1	JA Arzano (9)
105.	ES Colpo (10)	1–7	Avenir Theix (7)
106.	Bogue D'Or Questembert (8)	1–3	Espérance Bréhan (8)

=== Fourth round ===
These matches were played on 28 and 29 September 2019.

Fourth round results: Brittany
Tie no	Home team (tier)	Score	Away team (tier)
1.	Quimper Kerfeunteun FC (7)	2–3	Étoile St Laurent (7)
2.	PB Spézet (9)	0–2	AG Plouvorn (7)
3.	Stella Maris Douarnenez (6)	2–3	St Pierre Milizac (6)
4.	Gars de St Yves (7)	0–0 (3–2 p)	FC Pont-l'Abbé (8)
5.	AS Landeda (9)	1–2	AS Santec (8)
6.	Fleur de Genêt Bannalec (8)	2–4 (a.e.t.)	Guipavas GdR (6)
7.	Stade Plabennécois (5)	2–1 (a.e.t.)	Plouzané AC (5)
8.	AS Plouvien (8)	2–1	La Plozévetienne (8)
9.	Mélénicks Elliant (8)	2–0	Gas du Menez-Hom (8)
10.	Légion St Pierre (9)	0–6	Stade Briochin (4)
11.	Plougastel FC (7)	3–0	Amicale Ergué-Gabéric (8)
12.	ES Carantec-Henvic (9)	1–4	Landi FC (8)
13.	ASPTT Brest (7)	1–3	PD Ergué-Gabéric (5)
14.	Cormorans Sportif de Penmarc'h (8)	1–0	Quimper Ergué-Armel FC (8)
15.	Bodilis-Plougar FC (8)	2–1	Gas d'Ys Tréboul (9)
16.	AS Plougoumelen-Bono (9)	2–1	St Sébastien Caden (10)
17.	FC Naizin (8)	1–3	US Montagnarde (6)
18.	Espérance Bréhan (8)	4–1	Garde du Pont Marzan (8)
19.	FC Ploemeur (8)	0–1	US Quimperoise (7)
20.	Moutons Blanc de Noyal-Pontivy (7)	1–1 (2–3 p)	AS Ménimur (7)
21.	Ploërmel FC (7)	0–3	Stade Pontivyen (5)
22.	US Le Faouët (9)	0–2	FC Atlantique Vilaine (6)
23.	Avenir Theix (7)	5–1	La Patriote Malansac (8)
24.	CS Josselin (8)	0–4	Riantec OC (9)
25.	AS Bélugas Belz (8)	2–2 (2–3 p)	AS Cruguel (8)
26.	AG Arzal (10)	1–3	Baud FC (8)
27.	Séné FC (6)	1–2	Saint-Colomban Sportive Locminé (5)
28.	CS Quéven (8)	3–3 (3–4 p)	CEP Lorient (6)
29.	US Trégunc (5)	3–3 (9–8 p)	Vannes OC (4)
30.	Pordic-Binic FC (8)	0–9	FC Dinardais (7)
31.	Entente Samsonnaise Doloise (7)	0–0 (5–4 p)	Plaintel SF (8)
32.	JS Cavan (8)	0–3	Dinan-Léhon FC (5)
33.	AS Grâces (8)	1–3 (a.e.t.)	Lamballe FC (6)
34.	CO Briochin Sportif Ploufraganais (7)	5–0	US Goudelin (8)
35.	US Quessoy (6)	1–2	Loudéac OSC (6)
36.	AS Ploumilliau (10)	0–3	Stade Paimpolais FC (7)
37.	AS Trégueux (8)	1–1 (4–3 p)	ES Penguily (8)
38.	Dernières Cartouches Carhaix (8)	0–4	Lannion FC (5)
39.	FC St Bugan (8)	0–0 (3–2 p)	FC Trébeurden-Pleumeur-Bodou (8)
40.	AS Plélo (9)	0–3	US Saint-Malo (4)
41.	AS Ginglin Cesson (7)	3–1	US Erquy (8)
42.	Les Vallées FC (9)	1–2	AS Vignoc-Hédé-Guipel (6)
43.	Stade Évrannais (8)	1–8	TA Rennes (5)
44.	US Châteaugiron (7)	0–1	Fougères AGLD (5)
45.	La Cancalaise (8)	3–0	Indépendante Mauronnaise (9)
46.	SC Le Rheu (6)	1–1 (8–7 p)	Cadets de Bains (7)
47.	US Guignen (9)	0–2	Espérance Chartres-de-Bretagne (7)
48.	US Bain (9)	0–1	OC Montauban (7)
49.	OC Cesson (6)	3–0	Jeunes d'Argentré (7)
50.	US Billé-Javené (8)	0–1	CS Betton (8)
51.	ES St Germain/Montours (9)	0–2	US Liffré (7)
52.	FC Breteil-Talensac (6)	2–6	FC Guichen (5)
53.	FC Guipry-Messac (6)	1–2	AS Vitré (4)
54.	US Domagné-St Didier (9)	0–8	Cercle Paul Bert Bréquigny (7)
55.	Fondelienne Carentoir (9)	0–5	CO Pacéen (7)

=== Fifth round ===
These matches were played on 12 and 13 October 2019.

Fifth round results: Brittany
Tie no	Home team (tier)	Score	Away team (tier)
1.	AS Plougoumelen-Bono (9)	0–4	US Quimperoise (7)
2.	Lannion FC (5)	0–0 (2–4 p)	Saint-Colomban Sportive Locminé (5)
3.	Étoile St Laurent (7)	0–4	US Concarneau (3)
4.	Landi FC (8)	0–3	Gars de St Yves (7)
5.	Cormorans Sportif de Penmarc'h (8)	0–1 (a.e.t.)	US Montagnarde (6)
6.	Stade Briochin (4)	3–1	US Trégunc (5)
7.	AS Plouvien (8)	0–2	CEP Lorient (6)
8.	PD Ergué-Gabéric (5)	0–1	Guipavas GdR (6)
9.	Riantec OC (9)	2–1	AG Plouvorn (7)
10.	AS Santec (8)	0–4	St Pierre Milizac (6)
11.	Stade Paimpolais FC (7)	3–2	AS Ginglin Cesson (7)
12.	Mélénicks Elliant (8)	0–3	Stade Plabennécois (5)
13.	Bodilis-Plougar FC (8)	0–2	Stade Pontivyen (5)
14.	Baud FC (8)	2–0	Plougastel FC (7)
15.	OC Cesson (6)	1–1 (4–3 p)	AS Vitré (4)
16.	AS Trégueux (8)	0–2	Avenir Theix (7)
17.	US Saint-Malo (4)	1–1 (4–5 p)	Dinan-Léhon FC (5)
18.	AS Ménimur (7)	1–1 (4–3 p)	Entente Samsonnaise Doloise (7)
19.	OC Montauban (7)	0–4	TA Rennes (5)
20.	La Cancalaise (8)	0–2	AS Vignoc-Hédé-Guipel (6)
21.	US Liffré (7)	4–0	Espérance Chartres-de-Bretagne (7)
22.	FC St Bugan (8)	0–3	SC Le Rheu (6)
23.	CS Betton (8)	4–1 (a.e.t.)	AS Cruguel (8)
24.	FC Dinardais (7)	2–0	Espérance Bréhan (8)
25.	CO Pacéen (7)	0–1	Fougères AGLD (5)
26.	Loudéac OSC (6)	1–2	FC Atlantique Vilaine (6)
27.	Cercle Paul Bert Bréquigny (7)	2–2 (3–4 p)	FC Guichen (5)
28.	Lamballe FC (6)	3–0	CO Briochin Sportif Ploufraganais (7)

=== Sixth round ===
These matches were played on 26 and 27 October 2019.

Sixth round results: Brittany
Tie no	Home team (tier)	Score	Away team (tier)
1.	TA Rennes (5)	6–1	FC Atlantique Vilaine (6)
2.	Baud FC (8)	0–1	US Montagnarde (6)
3.	OC Cesson (6)	0–1	Stade Briochin (4)
4.	Riantec OC (9)	3–3 (6–7 p)	CEP Lorient (6)
5.	US Liffré (7)	1–1 (3–4 p)	Stade Pontivyen (5)
6.	Stade Paimpolais FC (7)	1–1 (4–3 p)	Saint-Colomban Sportive Locminé (5)
7.	St Pierre Milizac (6)	4–0	FC Dinardais (7)
8.	AS Ménimur (7)	1–3	FC Guichen (5)
9.	Gars de St Yves (7)	0–1	CS Betton (8)
10.	US Quimperoise (7)	1–6	Dinan-Léhon FC (5)
11.	Guipavas GdR (6)	2–2 (5–6 p)	Avenir Theix (7)
12.	Stade Plabennécois (5)	6–1	Fougères AGLD (5)
13.	SC Le Rheu (6)	2–0	Lamballe FC (6)
14.	AS Vignoc-Hédé-Guipel (6)	1–1 (2–4 p)	US Concarneau (3)
