= Florent Besnard =

French footballer (born 1984)

Personal information
- Date of birth: 30 April 1984 (age 42)
- Place of birth: Vannes, France
- Height: 1.73 m (5 ft 8 in)
- Position: Midfielder

Team information
- Current team: Saint-Colomban Locminé (manager)

Youth career
- ASPTT Vannes

Senior career*
Years	Team	Apps	(Gls)
2002–2003	Rennes II	2	(0)
2003–2005	GSI Pontivy	1	(0)
2005–2007	Vannes	72	(4)
2007–2009	Nîmes	32	(2)
2009	Moulins	19	(0)
2010–2011	Paris FC	22	(1)
2011	St-Pryvé/St-Hilaire	10	(0)
2011–2016	AS Vitré	114	(5)
2016–2020	Vannes	87	(2)
2020–2021	Saint-Colomban Locminé	4	(0)

Managerial career
- 2021–: Saint-Colomban Locminé
- * Club domestic league appearances and goals as of 1 July 2021

Florent Besnard (born 30 April 1984) is a French professional football coach and former player who coaches Championnat National 3 club Saint-Colomban Locminé.

== Career ==
A midfielder, Besnard played on the professional level in Ligue 2 for Nîmes Olympique.

In May 2021 he was appointed joint head coach of the club.
