= Saint-Colomban Sportive Locminé =

French football club

Saint-Colomban Locminé
- Full name: Saint-Colomban Sportive Locminé
- Nickname: St Co
- Founded: 1908
- Ground: Stade du Pigeon Blanc, Locminé
- Capacity: 2,350
- President: Hervé Laudic
- Head coaches: Jacques Pichard and Florent Besnard
- League: National 1 Group A
- 2025–26: National 2 Group A, 10th
- Website: www.saintcolomban-locmine.fr
Home colours

Saint-Colomban Sportive Locminé is a French football club situated in Locminé, Brittany. As of the 2026–27 season, they play in the Championnat National 1, the fourth level of the French football league system.

== History ==
The club was founded by the Abbé Padrun in 1908. During the 2010–11 season, the club won the and moved up to CFA 2. Following this rise, the club was granted a municipal subsidy of 7,500 euros.

In the 2011–12 Coupe de France, the team managed to reach the round of 64 of the competition, but they lost 2–1 against Paris Saint-Germain after extra-time.

On 24 May 2014, after a defeat against the Stade Brestois reserve, Locminé went down in DH but was drafted following the announcement of the bankruptcy of Vesoul HSF. The following season, the club came down in DH.

== Current squad ==
As of 30 November 2025

Note: Flags indicate national team as defined under FIFA eligibility rules; some limited exceptions apply. Players may hold more than one non-FIFA nationality.

No.	Pos.	Nation	Player
1	GK	FRA	Evan Dréau
3	DF	GAB	Azaria Obame
4	DF	FRA	Alexandre Le Nédic
5	DF	FRA	Alexandre Lavenant
6	MF	FRA	Marvin Luciathe
7	MF	FRA	Cyril Benamara
8	MF	FRA	Mathys Daubin
9	FW	FRA	Fodiba Danso
10	MF	FRA	Achille Degan
11	FW	FRA	Jeffrey Quarshie
12	MF	FRA	Florian Baranik

No.	Pos.	Nation	Player
13	FW	FRA	Ilan Ernoux
16	GK	SEN	Ibrahima Sy
18	FW	NCL	Georges Gope-Fenepej
20	DF	FRA	Benjamin Rio
22	MF	FRA	Mathéo Didot
23	MF	FRA	Mario-Jason Kikonda
24	FW	CGO	Exaucé Ngassaki
25	DF	FRA	Julien Faussurier
27	MF	FRA	Nathan Le Gouellec
28	DF	FRA	Mathis Belhaj
30	GK	FRA	Sofian Chafik

== Honours ==
- Régional 1: 2001, 2004, 2011
- Coupe de Bretagne: 1992, 2004
